= Druze power struggle (1658–1667) =

Tribal disputes during Ottoman rule in the Levant

Date	1658–1667
Location	Mount Lebanon, Galilee, Hauran (Ottoman Syria)
Result	Ottoman-Druze victory

Belligerents
Ottoman Empire: Ottoman Syria; Pro-Ottoman Druze clans	Ma'n dynasty

Commanders and leaders
Köprülü Mehmed Pasha; Sirhal Imad; Ali Alam al-Din; Sawaf	Ahmed Ma'an; Korkmuz Ma'an †

The Druze power struggle of 1658–1667 was a violent tribal dispute during Ottoman rule in the Levant. The conflict erupted between rebel and pro-Ottoman Druze factions over succession of the Maani rule.

== Background ==
In 1624, when the Ottoman sultan recognized Fakhr-al-Din II as lord of Arabistan (from Aleppo to the borders of Egypt), the Druze leader made Tiberias his capital. Fakhr, one of the most famous Druze emirs, was succeeded in 1635 by his nephew Mulhim Ma'an, who ruled through his death in 1658. Fakhr's only surviving son, Husayn, lived the rest of his life as a court official in Constantinople. Mulhim exercised iltizam taxation rights in the Chouf, Gharb, Jurd, Matn, and Kisrawan districts of Lebanon. Mulhim's forces battled and defeated those of Mustafa Pasha, Beylerbey of Damascus, in 1642, but he is reported by historians to have been otherwise loyal to Ottoman rule.

== Conflict ==
Following Mulhim's death in 1658, his sons Ahmad and Korkmaz (or Qurqmaz) entered into a power struggle with other Ottoman-backed Druze leaders.

In 1660, the Ottoman Empire moved to reorganize the region, placing the sanjaks (districts) of Sidon-Beirut and Safed in a newly formed province of Sidon, a move seen by local Druze as an attempt to assert control. An Ottoman expedition was dispatched to the area following the creation of the new administrative units, initially against the Shihabs and the Shia Hamades. The grand wazir Köprülü Mehmed Pasha came in person with the expedition. The Shihabs fled to the Hamades in the high Kisrawan, while the Ottoman troops pillaged Wadi al-Taym.

Claiming that the Shihabs allied with the Ma'anis, the Ottomans demanded Ahmad and Korkmaz to hand over the Shihabs and provide money for the Ottoman army, but the Ma'anis refused and fled to the Kisrawan as well. The Ma'anis lost control and the Druze of the Galilee lost their protection. Ottoman troops pillaged the area, seeking for the lords of Shihabs, Hamades and Ma'anis, causing "misery" to the peasants. As a result, the pro-Ottoman Druze overran much of the Galilee, most notably destroying the cities of Safed and Tiberias.

Alternative pro-Ottoman sheikhs Sirhal Imad and Ali Alam al-Din were briefly installed to rule the Druze country. Contemporary historian Istifan al-Duwayhi reports that Korkmaz was killed in act of treachery by the Beylerbey of Damascus in 1662. His brother Ahmad apparently escaped the plotting. In 1666, according to al-Safa, local Shia repulsed the governor of Sidon and a Ma'an force near Nabatiyeh.

In 1667, Ahmad Ma'an and his supporters defeated the pro-Ottoman Alam al-Din, Sawaf and others, near Beirut. Ahmad emerged victorious in the power struggle among the Druze in 1667, but the Maʿnīs lost control of Safad and retreated to controlling the iltizam of the Chouf mountains and Kisrawan, answerable to the Ottoman governor of Sidon. According to Abu-Husayn, after 1667 Ahmad resumed correspondence with the Tuscans.

== Aftermath ==
Ahmad continued as local ruler until his death from natural causes, without an heir, in 1697. During the Ottoman–Habsburg War (1683–1699), Ahmad collaborated in a rebellion against the Ottomans which extended beyond his death. Iltizam rights in Chouf and Kisrawan passed to the rising Shihab family through female-line inheritance. Despite conflicts in the 1660s, the Maan family played the leading role in the management of the internal affairs of this eyalet until the closing years of the 17th century, perhaps because it was not possible to manage the province—certainly not in the sanjak of Sidon-Beirut—without them.

== See also ==
- 1838 Druze rebellion
- 1860 Lebanon conflict
- Hauran Druze rebellion (1909)
- Great Syrian Revolt (Druze War 1924-1927)
- List of conflicts in the Near East
