= Yusuf Sayfa =

Ottoman Tripoli region governor (c. 1510–1625)

Yusuf Sayfa Pasha

Beylerbey of Tripoli
- In office 1579–1585
- Monarch: Murad III (r. 1574–1595)
- Preceded by: Office established
- Succeeded by: Ja'far Pasha al-Tuwashi
- In office 1590–c. 1609
- Monarchs: Murad III; Mehmed III (r. 1595–1603); Ahmed I (r. 1603–1617)
- Preceded by: Ja'far Pasha al-Tuwashi
- Succeeded by: Husayn Pasha al-Jalali
- In office c. 1619 – October/November 1622
- Monarch: Mustafa I (r. 1622–1623)
- Preceded by: Husayn Pasha al-Jalali
- Succeeded by: Umar Pasha Kittanji
- In office 8 January 1623 (Note: Yusuf did not take up office until the spring of 1623.) – 22 July 1625 (Note: Yusuf had been dismissed in early 1624 but refused to surrender his seat to his replacement Umar Pasha Katanci and was reinstated as governor in August 1624.)
- Monarch: Murad IV (r. 1623–1640)
- Preceded by: Umar Pasha Kittanji
- Succeeded by: Qasim Sayfa Pasha (Note: Qasim was not formally appointed governor but likely assumed office after an agreement with Yusuf's other surviving sons. He was replaced by the government-appointed Mustafa Pasha Iskanderoglu later in 1625.)

Personal details
- Died: 22 July 1625
- Relations: Ali Sayfa (brother or nephew); Muhammad ibn Ali Sayfa (nephew); Sulayman ibn Ali Sayfa (nephew); Ahmed Sayfa (nephew); Muhammad ibn Husayn (grandson); Ali ibn Bint Yusuf (grandson)
- Children: Husayn Pasha; Umar Pasha; Hasan; Qasim Pasha; Beylik; Mahmud; Assaf
- Parent: Muhammad Sayfa (father)

Yusuf Sayfa Pasha (Arabic: يوسف سيفا باشا, romanized: Yūsuf Sayfā Pāsha; c. 1510 – 22 July 1625) was a chieftain and multazim (tax farmer) in the Tripoli region who frequently served as the Ottoman beylerbey (provincial governor) of Tripoli Eyalet between 1579 and his death.

Yusuf or his family may have been Kurdish or Turkmen levends (tribal irregulars) from Marash and were established in Tripoli's vicinity by at least the 1510s–1520s. He became a multazim in Akkar subordinate to the Assaf chieftains of the Keserwan for most of his career until his promotion to the rank of pasha and appointment as Tripoli's first beylerbey in 1579. Hostilities consequently ensued with the Assafs, ending with Yusuf's assassination of their last chieftain in 1591 and his confiscation of their tax farms. His takeover of the Keserwan and Beirut prompted his first confrontation with Fakhr al-Din II, the Druze chieftain and sanjak-bey (district governor) of Sidon-Beirut in 1598. He was given command by the Sublime Porte (Ottoman imperial government) over the armies in the region of Syria to suppress the rebel Ali Janbulad of Aleppo in 1606. After a series of defeats at Hama, Tripoli and Damascus, he submitted to Janbulad at Krak des Chevaliers (Hisn al-Akrad), though the rebellion was suppressed in 1607.

Relations with the Ottomans deteriorated over the next ten years, a period in which Fakhr al-Din gained steady advantage over Yusuf, who was abandoned by most of his local allies and his nephews. To prevent Fakhr al-Din from gaining total control over Tripoli, the Porte reappointed Yusuf beylerbey in 1619. He remained under financial strain with large debts due to the Porte and owed to Fakhr al-Din, who gained control over most of the eyalet's districts. With his death in 1625, the Sayfas' power gradually dissipated and most of the family was exterminated by the Ottomans by the mid-17th century.

Yusuf was noted by contemporary historians for his generosity and patronage of poets and Sufis, which contributed to his poor financial state. Neither he nor his family developed Tripoli or its eyalet, which declined economically in contrast to the thriving domains of Fakhr al-Din. Although he was viewed favorably by the Sunni Muslims of Tripoli and Akkar for his loyalty to the Ottomans, he was resented by the Maronite peasantry for executing unpopular and ruinous government measures.

== Origins ==
Conventionally, the Sayfa family were considered to be Kurds based on the 19th-century, local chronicle of Tannus al-Shidyaq. The 16th-century Damascene historian and intimate of Yusuf, al-Hasan al-Burini, noted that the Sayfas were relatives of the Dulkadirids, a Marash-based Turkmen tribal dynasty. The 17th-century Maronite patriarch and historian Istifan al-Duwayhi referred to them as Turkmens. The modern historians Kamal Salibi and Abdul-Rahim Abu-Husayn concur that they were Turkmens in origin. The modern historian Stefan Winter holds that the Sayfas were probably of Kurdish origin but affiliated with the Dulkadirid Turkmens. Abu-Husayn notes that the Sayfas had been levends, citing the generally authoritative Ottoman historian Mustafa Naima (d. 1716). According to Naima, Yusuf hailed from Marash in the Anatolian–Syrian borderlands and moved from there to Tripoli.

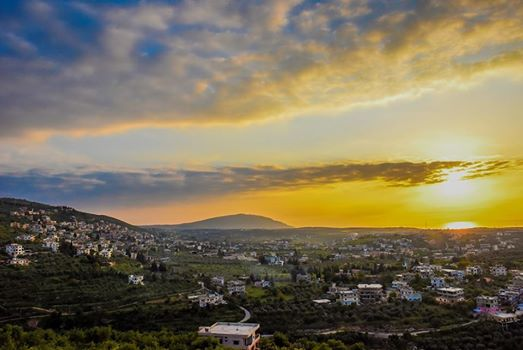
Yusuf and his family, the Sayfas, were established in the hills of Akkar (pictured in 2015)

Abu-Husayn surmises that the Sayfas may have arrived in Tripoli Sanjak during the dispersal of the Dulkadirids and their affiliates shortly before 1526 or shortly after their reestablishment that year. (Note: The Dulkadirids had retained significant autonomy under Ottoman suzerainty in the 15th century until the execution of their leading prince in 1522, the confiscation of their timars (fiefs), and the incorporation of their principality as an eponymous eyalet (province). Four years later they were restored to their timars.) The sanjak was a subdivision of Damascus Eyalet spanning the coastlands of Ottoman Syria from Latakia southward to Byblos and northern Mount Lebanon and the Alawite Mountains. The establishment of Turkmen and Kurdish military colonies around Tripoli started during Mamluk rule (mid-13th century–1516) to secure the strategic port city's mountainous hinterland and protect the roads connecting the Syrian coast with the major cities of the Syrian interior plains. The rugged ranges separating Tripoli from the Syrian interior, namely northern Mount Lebanon and the Alawite Mountains, were dominated by Catholic Maronites and the heterodox Muslim Alawites, two communities viewed with suspicion by the Sunni Muslim Mamluks and Ottomans, who conquered Mamluk Syria in 1516.

Duwayhi places Yusuf in Tripoli or its vicinity in 1528. He was likely ten to twelve years old at the time. Although Abu-Husayn asserts that Yusuf was the first member of the Sayfa clan whose name is recorded in the sources, Ottoman tax records name a certain Muhammad Sayfa as the holder of timars (fiefs) in the nahiyas (subdistricts) of Arqa, Batroun, Dinniyeh, Futuh Bani Rahhal, Akkar, Hisn al-Akrad, Manasif and Tartus, all in the Tripoli Sanjak, in 1519. Al-Shidyaq's chronicle records the name of Yusuf's father to be Muhammad. The tax records also indicate that a son of Muhammad Sayfa, Ibrahim, held timars in Arqa in 1534–1537 and 1548–1549; after Ibrahim's failure to report to the Baghdad front in the war with Safavid Iran in 1553, his timars were transferred to a certain Yusuf. (Note: Ottoman tax records indicate Ibrahim ibn Muhammad Sayfa's son and grandson, Ali and Husayn, also held timars in Arqa, in 1547 and 1571, respectively.)

=== Establishment in Akkar ===
Yusuf was headquartered in the fortress village of Hisn Akkar (Gibelacar). He formed ties with the local multazims (holders of iltizam, i.e. tax farms) upon moving to the area. Tax farming was the predominant mode of tax collection in Syria where sanjaks and nahiyas were farmed out to local strongmen for limited terms in return for a fixed amount of money. From Hisn Akkar Yusuf controlled Jabal Akkar, the northernmost part of Mount Lebanon, and possibly the Homs Gap plain at Jabal Akkar's northeastern edge. He and his paternal kinsman Hasan were given joint control of a farm in Akkar by the authorities in 1571.

The tax farms in Jabal Akkar were likely subleased to Yusuf from Mansur ibn Hasan, the head of the Turkmen Assaf dynasty. The Assaf multazims were headquartered from the 13th century in the village of Ghazir in the Keserwan area in central Mount Lebanon. Mansur leased the Jabal Akkar tax farm and other tax farms in the Tripoli Sanjak from Muhammad Agha Shu'ayb, the chieftain of a long-established military family based in the fortress of Arqa in the Akkar Plain, which had held the tax farms for all or part of the Tripoli region from 1523. Mansur may have encouraged Yusuf's establishment in Jabal Akkar to undermine the Shu'aybs by installing an ally in their vicinity. Conflict broke out soon afterward between the Sayfas and Shu'aybs in 1528 when the former withheld tax revenues from the latter. The Sayfa family, lacking the local power base of the Shu'aybs, consequently fled Akkar. They temporarily found refuge in Baruk under the protection of Qurqumaz ibn Yunis of the Ma'n dynasty, a long-established family of Druze chieftains and tax farmers who controlled the Chouf area in southern Mount Lebanon.

Not long after their displacement, the Sayfas were assisted by Mansur, who had also owed Muhammad Agha taxes. The Sayfas, Assafs and Ma'ns assaulted Arqa in 1528 and routed the Shu'aybs, while Mansur had Muhammad Agha assassinated. The Shu'aybs lost their local importance thereafter, (Note: The last member of the Shu'ayb family recorded in the sources was Chavush Muhammad Ibn Shu'ayb, who was granted all of the territory of the Tripoli and Sidon-Beirut sanjaks as iltizam in 1573–1574 in return for funding the building of three galleys for the Ottoman navy and a payment of 40,000 gold piasters.) and Mansur reestablished the Sayfas in their Akkar stronghold. After the demise of the Shu'aybs and Mansur's subsequent elimination of other local rivals he became the preeminent strongman of the Tripoli region; the Sayfas, with whom he continued to be allied, became his fiscal subordinates and there were no reported conflicts between Mansur and Yusuf before 1579. By then, Mansur had become the most powerful chieftain in Syria, acquiring the tax farms of the neighboring sanjaks of Homs and Hama and the port town of Beirut.

== Governorship of Tripoli ==
=== First term ===
The Citadel of Tripoli, center of the Tripoli Eyalet, which Yusuf governed from 1579 until his death in 1625, with several interruptions

The Sublime Porte (Ottoman imperial government in Constantinople) designated the Tripoli Sanjak as its own eyalet in 1579, likely to check Mansur's growing power and to strengthen Ottoman authority over Mount Lebanon and its environs in general; Duwayhi holds the Porte was responding to complaints about Mansur's killing of local rivals, which Abu-Husayn determines was used by the Ottomans as a pretext to keep a closer watch on Mansur because of his stockpiling of firearms acquired from the Ottoman conquest of Cyprus in 1571 and suspected ties through his Maronite advisers with Catholic European powers increasingly active in the eastern Mediterranean. (Note: At the time of Tripoli Eyalet's establishment in 1579, Mansur Assaf dominated Tripoli, Beirut, Homs and Hama, while much of southern Mount Lebanon was controlled by the Ma'nids and their allies, the Shihab clan of Wadi al-Taym).) Yusuf was promoted to the rank of pasha and appointed the new eyalet's first beylerbey. The subsequent loss of tax farms in Tripoli Eyalet, such as the predominantly Maronite area of Bsharri, and the appointment of Yusuf, weakened the Assafs.

According to Abu-Husayn, Yusuf was selected after "careful deliberation" by the Ottomans. On the one hand, the Porte determined Yusuf was well-positioned to efficiently manage the eyalet by dint of his long career in the Tripoli area, his ties to the local chiefs and his understanding of local politics. On the other hand, he would be easier to control because he lacked the tribal and peasant power bases of the Assafs and Ma'ns; further, Yusuf's headquarters in Hisn Akkar was more accessible and thus easier to reduce than the headquarters of other local chiefs nestled deep in the Lebanon range. By appointing Yusuf to a rank and position above that of the Assafs, his hitherto superiors, the Porte also aimed to undermine their alliance. The Sayfas' position was significantly strengthened with Mansur's death in 1580.

In 1585 an Ottoman punitive expedition was launched to suppress the local chieftains of Syria, who had long resisted government taxation and disarmament orders. While the expedition's commander Ibrahim Pasha attacked the Druze chiefs in the Chouf, the principal target of the expedition, a veteran commander, Ja'far Pasha al-Tuwashi, raided Hisn Akkar, an event which only Duwayhi mentions. During or shortly after the expedition, Yusuf was dismissed and replaced by Ja'far Pasha; Yusuf may have resisted his dismissal and Ja'far Pasha's raid against Hisn Akkar may have been the commander's response to his resistance. Following the government raids, most of the chiefs taken captive by the Ottomans were released to their home bases, including Mansur's son and successor Muhammad. The prominence of the Assafs was reconstituted by Muhammad, who became Yusuf's principal local rival. Muhammad had persuaded the Porte of his loyalty and was given the territory of Tripoli Eyalet, except for Tripoli city, as iltizam shortly after his release in 1585, once again placing Yusuf and his kinsmen in Akkar as fiscal subordinates of the Assafs; the Sayfas maintained their iltizam in Akkar, but were responsible to Muhammad, through whom they forwarded revenues to the Porte.

=== Second term ===
Yusuf and Muhammad likely waged a struggle for political dominance of the Tripoli region afterward. By 1590 Yusuf had been reinstated as beylerbey in place of Ja'far Pasha, though he may have been reappointed before 1590. In that year he was ordered by the Porte to arrest the advisers of the Assafs from the Maronite Hubaysh family, the brothers Abu Sa'd Mansur and Muhanna, and to deal with certain tax and administrative matters. Yusuf's attempts to arrest the Hubaysh brothers likely instigated conflict between him and Muhammad. Duwayhi held that Yusuf owed Muhammad tax arrears, while Ottoman records indicate that Muhammad had owed taxes to the Porte, which ordered the beylerbey of Damascus to collect them with Yusuf's assistance shortly before Muhammad's death in 1590 or 1591. Muhammad had set out from Ghazir against Yusuf but was assassinated en route at Musayliha on Yusuf's orders. His death without progeny marked the end of Assaf power.

Muhammad's tax liability was transferred to Yusuf, who was ordered to appropriate all of Muhammad's money, real property and stockpiled goods. Yusuf subsequently confiscated Muhammad's iltizam in Tripoli Eyalet. He took possession of Assaf properties in Beirut, Ghazir and Antelias, either forcibly or by purchasing them from Muhammad's widow. The imperial order further called for Yusuf to imprison Muhammad's kethuda (chief aide) Ghumayda, investigate his books and confiscate his wealth. Although the Porte's order called for Yusuf to transfer all confiscated Assaf assets and moneys to the Ottoman state, he did not comply and kept the possessions for himself. In the same year, he carried out the 1590 imperial order to arrest and execute the Hubaysh brothers. In 1592/93 Husayn ibn Janbulad, the Kurdish chieftain of Kilis and career Ottoman official, was appointed beylerbey of Tripoli, an act which, for unclear reasons, was opposed by Ghumayda, who had since been released and given charge of an iltizam in Tripoli Eyalet. When Ghumayda set out for Constantinople to protest Husayn's appointment, he was killed en route. The Porte, suspecting Husayn's involvement in the killing, canceled his appointment to Tripoli before he could assume the office. The episode may have caused tensions between the Sayfa and Janbulad clans. Yusuf remained in office through 1592, when the Porte issued an order to him regarding the shipment of olive oil-based soap from Tripoli, an important soap production center in the 16th–17th centuries, to Constantinople. The Porte also sent notices to the beylerbey of Damascus that year raising concerns about Yusuf's employment of imperial Janissaries stationed in Damascus.

==== Early conflict with Fakhr al-Din II ====
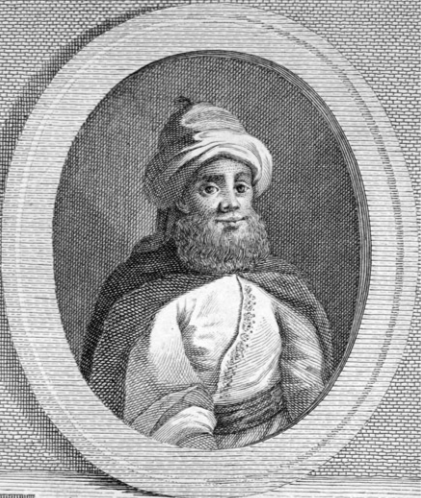
An engraving of Fakhr al-Din Ma'n, who became Yusuf's most prominent local adversary from 1598 until Yusuf's death in 1625

In 1593 Yusuf married Muhammad's widow and took control of the Keserwan and Beirut iltizam. His new wife was escorted to Tripoli by his Shia Muslim allies, the Hamade clan. Yusuf's takeover of Beirut and the Keserwan, both of which were part of Damascus Eyalet, gained him the ire of the Damascus provincial government. His increasing proximity to Ma'nid domains in the southern Lebanon range provoked Fakhr al-Din II, the sanjak-bey of Sidon-Beirut Sanjak from 1592 and the son and successor of Qurqumaz ibn Yunis, who had died in the 1585 expedition. In 1598 the Damascus beylerbey Seyyed Mehmed Pasha ordered Fakhr al-Din and Musa al-Harfush of Baalbek to force Yusuf out of the Keserwan and Beirut. Fakhr al-Din and Musa engaged Yusuf's forces in a battle near the Nahr al-Kalb river in the Keserwan, slaying his brother or nephew Ali Sayfa, and conquering Beirut and the Keserwan. Fakhr al-Din held the two territories for one year, before agreeing to withdraw his forces and return both territories to Yusuf after reaching unspecified accommodations with him. The battle at Nahr al-Kalb inaugurated a rivalry between Yusuf and Fakhr al-Din which lasted for the remainder of Yusuf's life. The rivalry became a conspicuous aspect of the local culture, as exemplified in a verse from the wine ode of a contemporary poet addressed to his companion:

Let us not speak of Ibn Sayfa and Ibn Ma'n
enemies seek one another out
What have we to do with wars?
— Ibrahim ibn Muhammad al-Akrami al-Salihi of Damascus (d. 1637).

Yusuf engaged the Hamades in 1600 to assault and drive out the muqaddams (local chieftains) of the village of Jaj in the Byblos nahiya in retaliation for their alleged support for Fakhr al-Din. Yusuf furthered his ties with the Damascene Janissaries, allying with one of their two main leaders, Kurd Hamza. In 1601 Yusuf sent 1,000 soldiers to back the Damascene Janissaries when they were blocked from entering Aleppo by an imperial guard. Kurd Hamza repaid Yusuf the following year by participating in his fifty-day siege of Musa in Baalbek. After they captured its citadel, they pillaged several villages in its countryside, including Hadath. In that village, Yusuf executed several captive partisans of Musa because of their alleged culpability in the slaying of Ali Sayfa at Nahr al-Kalb.

==== Conflict with Ali Janbulad ====
In 1606 Ali ibn Ahmed ibn Janbulad, a nephew of Husayn ibn Janbulad, launched a revolt from Aleppo. Although Ali remained ostensibly loyal to Ottoman Sultan Ahmed I, he engaged in secretive talks with the Duke of Tuscany, Ferdinand I, to establish an independent realm over Syria; the Tuscans had also been negotiating a secretive alliance with Fakhr al-Din from 1603. Yusuf, fearing the ambitions of the Janbulads and seeking to curry favor with the Porte, requested and obtained from the imperial government military aid and the rank of serdar (commander-in-chief) of the Ottoman forces throughout Syria in late 1606. At the time the bulk of imperial forces were engaged in the war with Austria, compelling the sultan to grant Yusuf's request. Yusuf stood to gain considerable clout by neutralizing the Janbulads without obligating the Porte to intervene directly.

Ali viewed Yusuf as an obstacle to his territorial ambitions in Syria and resolved to kill or capture him. Yusuf's forces, consisting of the imperial and provincial troops of Damascus, Tripoli and Hama, were routed by Ali in a relatively quick battle near Hama on 24 July. Yusuf fled to Tripoli and most of his allies defected to Ali. Fakhr al-Din, despite Ottoman orders to join Yusuf, joined Ali after Hama. Ali and Fakhr al-Din advanced through the Beqaa Valley, while a division of Ali's forces led by his cousin Darwish ibn Habib attacked Tripoli. Yusuf fled the city for Cyprus, leaving command of Tripoli's citadel to his mamluk (slave soldier) Yusuf. Darwish's troops plundered Tripoli's countryside and captured the city after a short battle, taking the treasure stored in the citadel. Fakhr al-Din likely retook the Keserwan from Yusuf about the same time.

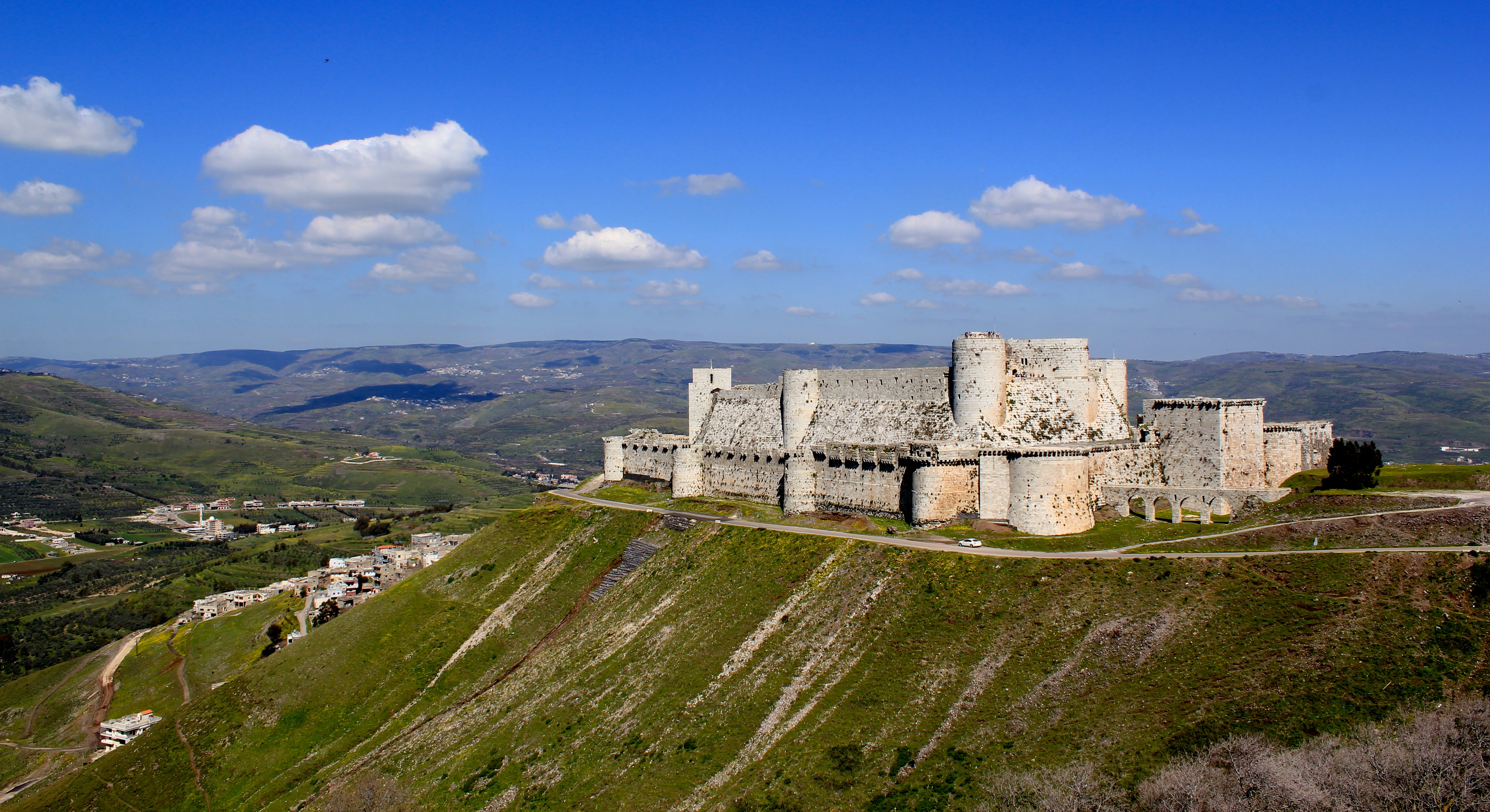
Yusuf, as head of the Ottoman armies in Syria, made an unsuccessful last stand against the rebel Ali Janbulad at Krak des Chevaliers in 1606. Despite frequent dismissals from Tripoli and territorial losses to his adversaries, Yusuf consistently held onto the fortress. Shortly after he died, his sons surrendered it to Fakhr al-Din

From Cyprus Yusuf went to Haifa, a port village controlled by the sanjak-bey of Lajjun, Ahmad Turabay. After securing an escort of Damascene Janissaries, he proceeded to Damascus. Ali and Fakhr al-Din proceeded through Wadi al-Taym, bringing them closer to the city. Yusuf mobilized his Damascene troops, including the Janissaries, which were swelled by soldiers from Jerusalem, Nablus, Gaza, Lajjun, and Ajlun, all sanjaks of Damascus located in Palestine and Transjordan. A dissident Janissary faction led by Kiwan ibn Abdullah secretly collaborated with Fakhr al-Din. Ali and Fakhr al-Din moved their forces to the suburbs of Damascus where Yusuf's troops, led by his nephew Muhammad, were defeated in a battle on 30 September or mid-October.

Part of the Damascene troops retreated into the city, rejecting Ali's demand to surrender Yusuf. The suburbs were then sacked for three days and Yusuf was besieged. He attempted to escape, but the officials of Damascus, alarmed at the potential economic fallout of the city's impending sack, forced him to pay 100,000 gold piasters as compensation before allowing his departure. According to al-Burini, Yusuf did not lead his troops during the Damascus engagements and "remained in hiding among the womenfolk" until he could be "smuggled out of the city by night" under the escort of a Damascene guard. Ali condemned the city's leaders upon hearing of Yusuf's flight, claiming had they "wanted peace and safety they should not have allowed him [Yusuf] to leave, knowing that I only came ... to seek him, because he had bought [a] war against me from the Porte for 50,000 dinars". Ali lifted the siege after being bribed by the Damascenes with Yusuf's forfeited money plus an additional 25,000 piasters.

Yusuf escaped to Krak des Chevaliers, a fortress in the Homs Gap governed by his uncle Mahmud Sayfa. Ali pursued Yusuf and demanded that he make peace sealed by a marriage alliance between their families. They reached an arrangement whereby Yusuf, Fakhr al-Din and Ali wielded practical control over Syria with Ali at their head. Yusuf married off one of his daughters to Ali, while Yusuf's son Husayn was wed to Ali's sister. Abu-Husayn notes the agreement left Yusuf "in the awkward position where he became subservient to the rebel Ali Janbulad, while trying at the same time to remain loyal to the Porte." Ali's revolt was suppressed in 1607–1608 by Grand Vizier Kuyucu Murad Pasha after imperial troops were released from the Austrian front following the Peace of Zsitvatorok.

=== Tensions with the government out of office ===
==== Consolidation of local alliances and dismissal ====
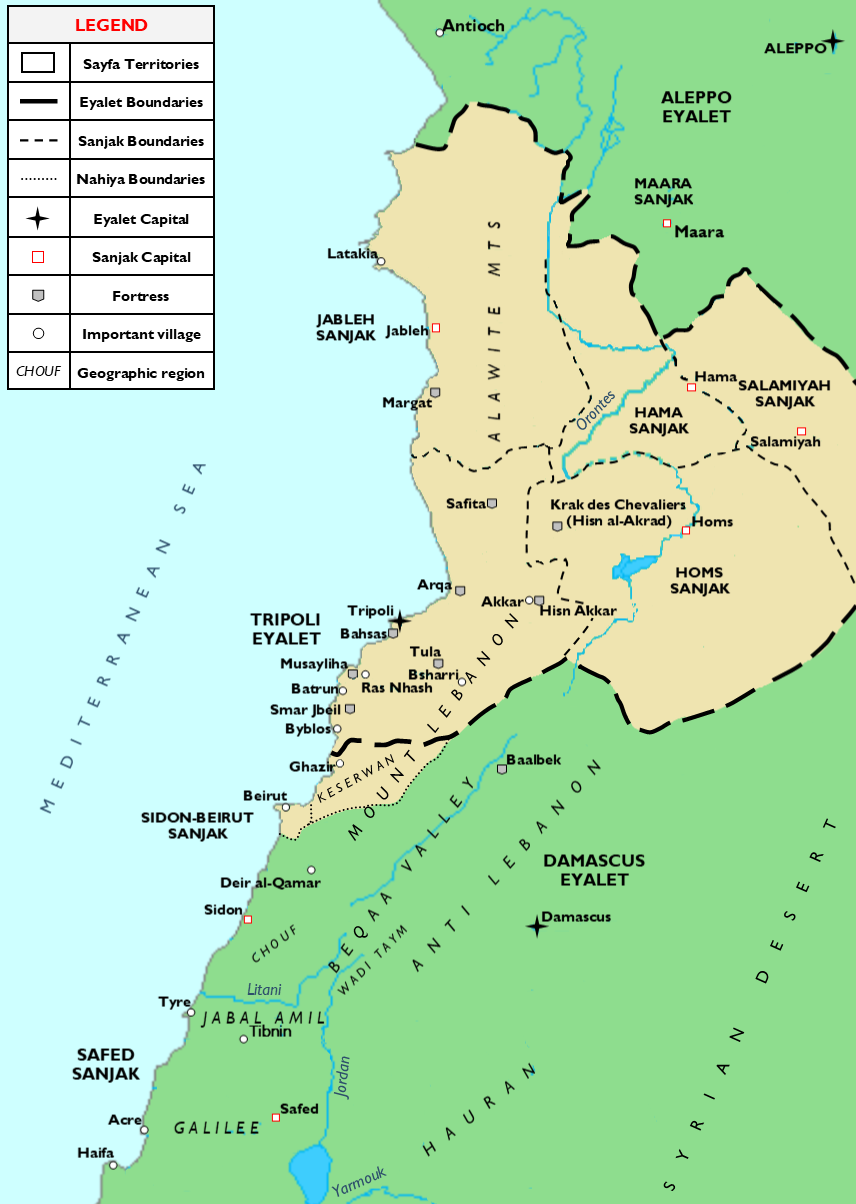
At the height of his power Yusuf Sayfa controlled the Tripoli Eyalet and neighboring Keserwan and Beirut

By the 1600s Yusuf "had become almost completely Syrianized", in the words of Abu-Husayn, by becoming enmeshed in the power structure of Syria's chieftains instead of solely dependent on the Porte, except that he continued to lack his own significant, local power base. His closest local ally was the Kurdish Sunni emir Musa of Ras Nhash. Yusuf's closest Bedouin allies were the Al Musa of the Akkar plain. Among the Druze chieftains of southern Lebanon, Yusuf was allied with the rivals of Fakhr al-Din, namely Shaykh Muzaffar of Ain Dara in the Jurd nahiya southeast of Beirut, Emir Muhammad ibn Jamal al-Din of Choueifat in the Gharb nahiya south of Beirut and the Sawwaf muqaddams of Chbaniyeh in the Matn nahiya east of Beirut. He also split Harfush ranks by allying with one of the family's chiefs, Shalhub.

By c. 1609 Yusuf had been dismissed by Kuyucu Murad Pasha and replaced by an official from Constantinople, Husayn Pasha al-Jalali. His dismissal may have been intended to check his burgeoning local power or was engineered by Fakhr al-Din, who maintained close ties with the grand vizier dating to the 1590s. To prevent Yusuf from hindering his replacement's attempts to collect taxes in the eyalet, the grand vizier in 1610 instructed the beylerbeys of Damascus and Aleppo and Fakhr al-Din, who was still sanjak-bey of Sidon-Beirut and Safad, to assist al-Jalali in the event. Around that time a kapicibasi (head doorkeeper) sent by the beylerbey of Damascus Ahmad Pasha al-Hafiz to collect a debt from Yusuf was taken captive and executed by Yusuf along with his two attendants. The Porte afterward sent an order to al-Jalali to arrest and punish the killers without naming Yusuf explicitly.

With frayed relations between him and the government, Yusuf sought improved ties with Fakhr al-Din, sending reinforcements to aid the latter's son Ali during a battle with the Damascene Janissaries in the Hauran in 1613. Later that year an expedition by al-Hafiz compelled Fakhr al-Din's flight to Tuscany. Yusuf used the opportunity to reclaim the Porte's favor, sending a force under his son Husayn and nephew Ahmad Sayfa to fight alongside al-Hafiz. The Sayfa force intercepted Ma'nid reinforcements from their Deir al-Qamar headquarters sent to relieve the Ma'n-held Beaufort Castle (Shaqif Arnun) on the Litani River. The Sayfas played the key role in the siege fighting at Beaufort. Husayn began to burn Deir al-Qamar, but was stopped by an official order after the Ma'ns submitted to al-Hafiz. During the expedition, al-Hafiz rewarded the Sayfas by restoring to them Beirut and the Keserwan.

By early 1614, Husayn was made a pasha and appointed beylerbey of Tripoli, though Yusuf unofficially exercised power. The Sidon-Beirut and Safad sanjaks became an eyalet in 1614 and its beylerbey Bustanci Hasan Pasha demanded and received from the Sayfas the tax farm of Beirut; they refused to hand over the Keserwan and repulsed an attempt by Bustanci Hasan to seize it. By 1615, Sidon Eyalet was dissolved and they retook Beirut once more.

==== Ouster from Tripoli ====
The Sayfas' ascendancy ended in 1616 as a result of imperial and provincial reshuffles. The Sayfas lost a friendly grand vizier in Nasuh Pasha, al-Hafiz was replaced in Damascus by Cherkes Muhammad Pasha who transferred Beirut and the Keserwan to the Ma'ns, Husayn was replaced by al-Jalali and sent to the Safavid front, and Yusuf's enemy Yunus al-Harfush was appointed sanjak-bey of Homs and attacked Yusuf's allies Shalhub and the Al Musa. Yusuf resisted the transfer of the Keserwan and Beirut to the Ma'ns, who subsequently defeated the Sayfas and their Druze allies in four engagements in the southern Lebanon in August. Yusuf's son Hasan, on his way back to Akkar after retreating from the Keserwan was captured by al-Jalali's troops and released after a large bribe by Yusuf. The following year, Husayn was arrested and executed in Aleppo on his way back from the Safavid front, despite Yusuf's attempted bribery of the Porte. As his position with the government deteriorated, Yusuf's nephews, the sons of Ali Sayfa, Muhammad and Sulayman, defected from him. The former had been made sanjak-bey of Jableh in Tripoli Eyalet in late 1615, while the latter proclaimed his alliance with the Ma'ns from his fortress of Tula in Jubbat Bsharri after Husayn's execution. Yusuf stamped out Sulayman's rebellion shortly afterward.

Fakhr al-Din returned to Mount Lebanon in December 1617 and took advantage of Yusuf's weakened position. In 1618/19 Umar Pasha Kittanji was appointed beylerbey of Tripoli, though his practical authority was confined to the city of Tripoli, the countryside being controlled by Yusuf, who refused to forward tax revenues to the new governor. Fakhr al-Din, who offered to help Umar Kittanji assert control over the eyalet, marched against Hisn Akkar, which Yusuf abandoned on 3 February 1619. Fakhr al-Din plundered the fortress and a caravan of provisions bound for Yusuf, who had set up base in Krak des Chevaliers with his Druze allies. Yusuf's young grandson Muhammad ibn Husayn was captured and held hostage by a Ma'nid force, while Fakhr al-Din proceeded to besiege Yusuf on 7 February. Muhammad and Sulayman Sayfa, meanwhile, restated their alliance with the Ma'ns and fortified themselves in Safita. At the same time Yunus al-Harfush captured the Sayfa-held nahiyas of Hermel and Qayraniya, both north of Baalbek.

=== Third term ===
As the siege against Yusuf progressed the Porte, possibly seeking to avoid a total victory by Fakhr al-Din, reinstated Yusuf as beylerbey of Tripoli. Fakhr al-Din and Umar Kittanji pressed their offensive, having the village of Akkar burnt down and recruiting Yusuf's men in the forts of Byblos and Smar Jbeil south of Tripoli. Afterward, the beylerbeys of Damascus and Aleppo moved their troops to Homs and Hama, respectively, to support Yusuf. With the leverage afforded by the government, Yusuf bargained with Fakhr al-Din and Umar Kittanji, who agreed to a bribe of 50,000 piasters each, with an equivalent sum to be paid later. They lifted the siege on 4 March and Yusuf assumed office in Tripoli shortly thereafter.

Yusuf remained under financial strain due to debts owed to the Porte, the beylerbeys of Damascus and Aleppo, and Fakhr al-Din. The latter had taken over Byblos and Jubbat Bsharri during the Krak des Chevaliers siege and Yusuf, unable to pay his debt to Fakhr al-Din, agreed to sublease their iltizam to him for four years in compensation. In 1620 Yusuf attempted to regain the tax farms by offering Fakhr al-Din permanent peace terms, but his offer was rejected. Instead, Fakhr al-Din moved to bribe the Porte 100,000 piasters to have Yusuf replaced by al-Jalali, while Fakhr al-Din's kethuda Mustafa was appointed sanjak-bey of Jableh and Latakia. In response, Yusuf pledged 230,000 piasters to the Porte, resulting in the cancellation of the appointments to al-Jalali and Mustafa before either could assume office. Fakhr al-Din continued machinations against Yusuf, securing an alliance with the Damascus Janissary leaders Kurd Hamza and Kiwan, who pressured Yusuf's son Umar Pasha, the sanjak-bey of Homs, to execute his kethuda over a land dispute. When Yusuf attempted to subjugate his nephew Sulayman in Safita in June 1621, Fakhr al-Din allied with Sulayman and jointly took over the village of Akkar where the Sayfas' houses were again destroyed.

In the following month, the Porte, unable to collect owed taxes from Yusuf, charged Fakhr al-Din with collecting the payment. The Ma'nid emir advanced against Yusuf's domains, capturing the fortress of al-Bahsas south of Tripoli before besieging its citadel. Under pressure, Yusuf, who fled to Jableh, agreed to surrender his properties in Beirut, Ghazir and Antelias to Fakhr al-Din personally, thereby definitively ending Sayfa claims to the Keserwan and Beirut. The siege was maintained until the tax arrears to the Porte were paid. Yusuf persuaded the Porte that Fakhr al-Din was using the tax issue to take over Tripoli Eyalet and promised to pay the arrears. Fakhr al-Din was consequently withdrawn from Tripoli on 2 October 1621, while Yusuf paid part of the arrears out of the silk revenues of the eyalet.

=== Fourth term ===
Yusuf was dismissed from Tripoli on October/November 1622 for failure to remit the balance of the eyalet's tax arrears. He refused to relinquish the post to his replacement, Umar Kittanji, prompting Fakhr al-Din to mobilize his men at Ghazir. Yusuf then fled to Akkar, but was abandoned by his son Beylik, who defected to Fakhr al-Din, his father-in-law. Umar Kittanji assumed office in January 1623, but was unable to extract the tax revenues of the province, which were held by Yusuf. Fakhr al-Din agreed to assist Umar Kittanji in return for the tax farms of Byblos, Jubbat Bsharri, Dinniya and Jabal Akkar. The Porte reinstated Yusuf as beylerbey later on 23 January, which Fakhr al-Din accepted, provided he retain the newly acquired tax farms of the eyalet. To meet his tax obligations to the Porte and avoid further dismissals from Tripoli, Yusuf advanced once more against Sulayman in Safita, but again called off the campaign after Fakhr al-Din mobilized his troops in Bsharri against him.

Beylik, meanwhile, took control of Hisn Akkar and threw in his lot with Fakhr al-Din, who was assisted by Beylik and Sulayman during an expedition near Hama to assist the Bedouin emir of the Al Abu Risha, Mudlij ibn Zahir al-Hayari, against his cousin Husayn ibn Fayyad al-Hayari in November. In 1624 the two Sayfas were joined in their alliance with Fakhr al-Din by Yusuf's son Umar Pasha of Homs. By then, Yusuf's allies Shalhub and Muzaffar al-Andari had also defected to Fakhr al-Din. In the spring the Porte dismissed Yusuf as beylerbey, but he refused to turn over the city to his replacement Umar Kittanji, who alternatively docked his ship in the port of Batroun, which was controlled by the Ma'ns, in April. From Tripoli Yusuf negotiated with the Porte to reinstate him on the one hand, and with Fakhr al-Din, whose assistance was requested by Umar Kittanji, to stall the Druze emir from military action. By August he had secured his reinstatement and bribed Fakhr al-Din to hold off an assault. His authority was effectively restricted to the city of Tripoli, Krak des Chevaliers, the Jabala Sanjak governed by his son Qasim, and the Koura nahiya held by the Kurdish emirs of Ras Nhash; the rest of the eyalet, namely the nahiyas of Jubbat Bsharri, Batroun, Byblos, Dinniyeh and Akkar and the sanjaks of Safita and Homs, were in the hands of Fakhr al-Din or his Sayfa allies.

== Death and legacy ==
Yusuf died on 14 or 15 Sha'ban 1034 AH/21 or 22 July 1625. Naima noted that Yusuf had lived for considerably longer than a century. The Aleppine historian Abu al-Wafa al-Urdi (d. 1660), remarked that a Sufi religious leader considered Yusuf to be among four men of whom "time had become weary". In the words of Abu-Husayn, Yusuf's "arrival as a levend in Syria had started the history of the Sayfa family there ... his death, for all practical purposes, brought this history to an end".

=== Residual influence and demise of the Sayfas ===
The divisions within the Sayfa household deepened with Yusuf's death. Three of his surviving sons, Qasim, Mahmud and Beylik divided his domains with Qasim given control of Tripoli city. His rule was not recognized by the Porte, which appointed Mustafa Pasha ibn Iskandar beylerbey in late 1625. The new governor allied with Fakhr al-Din, appointed Sulayman to Hisn Akkar, and moved against Yusuf's sons. Qasim fled to the Margat fortress in Jabala Sanjak, and Beylik and Mahmud fled to Krak des Chevaliers. Fakhr al-Din turned against Sulayman, attacking Safita and forcing him to seek protection with Mudlij al-Hayari in the Abu Risha stronghold of Salamiyah. The Bedouin emir executed Sulayman in late 1625 or early 1626 on the Porte's orders for alleged collaboration with the Safavids. Around that time Yusuf's sons surrendered Margat and Krak des Chevaliers to Fakhr al-Din, who interceded on their behalf with Mustafa Pasha. Two more beylerbeys were successively appointed to Tripoli, Umar Pasha and Ibrahim Pasha, before Fakhr al-Din was given the post in 1627, which he held until his imprisonment by the Porte in 1633.

Afterward, Qasim was made a pasha and appointed beylerbey in 1634. Upon being ordered to the Safavid front later that year he pretended insanity and was replaced by his nephew Ali Sayfa, the son of Yusuf's daughter. Yusuf's son Assaf, whose mother, Malak Sama bint Abdullah, was a concubine, drove Ali out of Tripoli after two months in office. Ali then allied with Ali Alam al-Din, the Ottoman-appointed successor of Fakhr al-Din over the Druze iltizam of southern Mount Lebanon, and with his support defeated Assaf and retook control of Tripoli, as well as Batroun and Byblos, in late 1635. In 1636 Ali was replaced as beylerbey by Mustafa Pasha Nishanji, who appointed Ali over Byblos, Batroun and Dinniya. When Nishanji was sent to the Safavid front, he made Assaf his placeholder over the eyalet to Ali's chagrin. Strife ensued between the two Sayfa chiefs, which caused heavy casualties and financial strain among the eyalet's inhabitants, who were obligated to pay each chief the same taxes. After Ali was defeated near Arqa, the two Sayfas were reconciled though the mediation of the Abu Risha emir Tarbush. Before the end of the year, a new beylerbey was appointed to Tripoli, Barjal Ahmad, and not long after, in 1637, the reconciliation between Assaf and Ali unraveled for unclear reasons. Ali was backed by Barjal Ahmad and Alam al-Din, while Assaf was supported by Mulhim, Fakhr al-Din's nephew and successor over the Ma'ns, and the Abu Risha emir Assaf ibn Mudlij. The latter faction moved against Ali, chasing him into the Alawite Mountains.

The Porte appointed Shahin Pasha to replace Barjal Ahmad with explicit orders to destroy the Sayfa family. He invited the Safya chiefs to meet in his camp in the Homs Gap where he trapped and executed Assaf, hanging his body at Krak des Chevaliers, while Ali, suspicious of the summons, fled the eyalet. Shahin Pasha proceeded to exterminate any Sayfas in and around Tripoli and confiscated their properties. The only recorded survivors of the family were Ali, Assaf's mother Malak, and a certain Sulayman Sayfa whose relation to Yusuf was not clarified by the sources. Ali took refuge with Alam al-Din in the southern Lebanon, while Sulayman was reported in the Akkar nahiya in 1640. That year, he fought a government force in the area then fled, with nothing else known about him. Malak retired to the Qaymariyya quarter of Damascus and was recorded living there later in the century by the historian Muhammad al-Muhibbi (d. 1699). According to Muhibbi, when asked about her family, she recited a verse lamenting their demise. With the elimination of the Sayfas, the family "appear[s] to have been completely forgotten" in the region, according to Abu-Husayn.

== Assessment ==
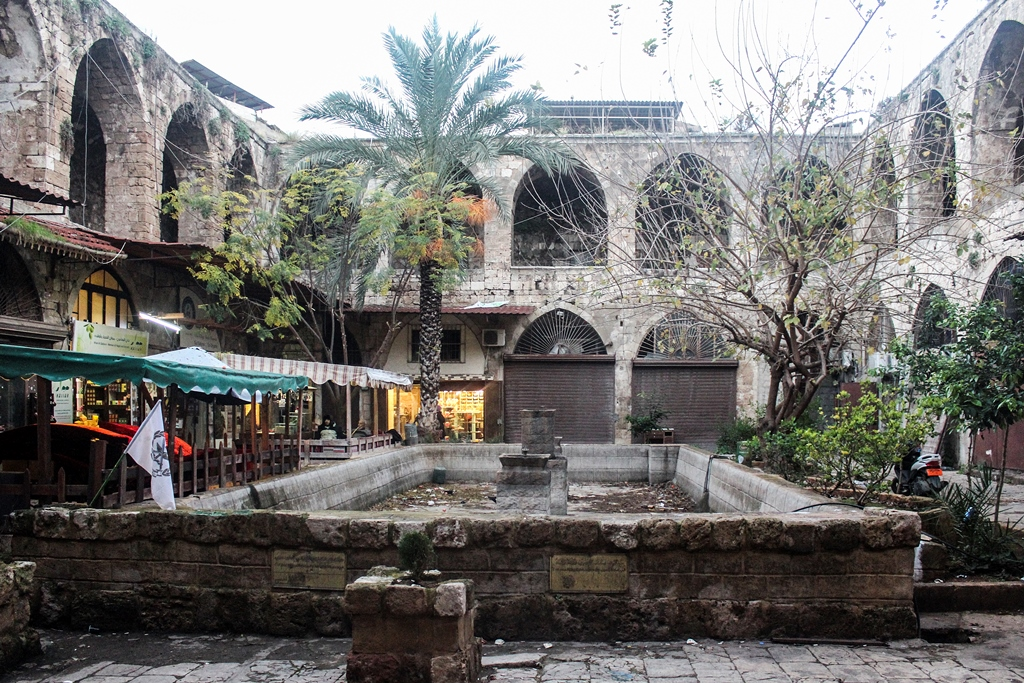
The Soap Caravanserai (Khan al-Saboun) in Tripoli, which was originally built by Yusuf in the early 17th century as a barracks

The sources present a mixed assessment of the rule of Yusuf and the Sayfa family in general. The Sunni Muslim Tripolitanian scholar Mustafa Jamal al-Din Ibn Karama offered the most positive view of Yusuf's rule, writing "In his eyalet, the ra'iyya (subjects) sleep in peace, and wake up happy because he is there". Ibn Karama, al-Burini, al-Muhibbi, al-Urdi, Najm al-Din Muhammad al-Ghazzi (d. 1651) and Ramadan al-Utayfi (d. 1684), all members of the urban Sunni Muslim scholarly establishment in Syria, indicate that Yusuf was known for his generosity and patronage of poets and Sufis. Examples include Yusuf's protection of the Sufi sheikh Ahmad al-Kawakibi of Aleppo who fled the persecution of Aleppo's beylerbey Husayn ibn Janbulad in the 1600s, his financial assistance to the impoverished Hanafi mufti and poet Ibrahim al-Batruni of Aleppo, and the generous treatment of al-Burini upon his visit to Tripoli and Akkar in 1599/1600. Remarking on the Sayfa family's generosity, al-Utayfi wrote "People, whether needy or not, called on them from various regions; it is said that they have revived the days of the Barmakids", who were known for their generosity. Salibi asserts Yusuf's spending and patronage partly caused his consistently poor financial state. Likewise, Abu-Husayn holds that Yusuf's generosity represented "a costly means to gain recognition" amid persistent financial difficulties, which frequently resulted in his dismissal from office or his loss of fiscal districts. The view of Yusuf by imperial Ottoman officialdom is reflected in Naima's assessment:

Yusuf Pasha was a devious old man with a white beard, a sunburnt complexion, and a long face. He killed many men in Tripoli and threw them into a well, so that nobody could say that the Pasha killed any one. He terrorized people to that extent, and by so doing he managed to acquire large amounts of money, burying many treasures in various ruins.

In the assessment of Salibi, because the inhabitants of the Akkar, like the townspeople of Tripoli, were predominantly Sunni Muslims and were loyal, or at least not opposed in principle to the Ottoman state, which they considered the global bastion of Sunni Islam, Yusuf "stood to gain ... [the inhabitants'] support" by serving the Ottomans. Although the Sunni Muslim townspeople and peasants generally supported Yusuf, who maintained close relations with the Ottoman officials of Tripoli, his local manpower remained opportunistic and not loyal to him personally.

Yusuf strove to gain the trust of the Maronites of Byblos, Batroun and Jubbat Bsharri, for whom the Ottomans were generally unpopular. To that end he fended off an attack against the Maronites of Jubbat Bsharri by Shia Muslim peasants from Baalbek in 1602. Duwayhi, who calls Yusuf "a great emir", noted the friendly ties between Yusuf and one of Duwayhi's predecessors, Patriarch Yusuf al-Ruzzi (1597–1608), for whom Yusuf frequently secured permits of safe conduct. Duwayhi also stated that under Yusuf, Maronites who had professed Islam to secure their personal interests reverted to publicly proclaiming their Christian faith. Nonetheless, Yusuf continued to be viewed as an agent of the state and its oppressive policies by the Maronite peasantry. His oversight of the Porte-ordered quartering of troops in 1607 led to the abandonment of four Maronite villages in Batroun, while his excessive taxation on fruit trees in 1621 led to the ruin of eight villages in Jubbat Bsharri and the flight of many Maronites to Damascus and Aleppo. The Maronites preferred the rule of Fakhr al-Din, a practically independent native who had considerable support from the Maronites' Catholic coreligionists in the Italian states. The English traveler George Sandys, who visited Syria in 1610, noted: "this Joseph [Yusuf Sayfa] [was] hated of his people for his excessive tyrannie."

Neither Yusuf nor the other Sayfas invested in or promoted the economic development of Tripoli and its eyalet. There are no indications in the sources that they took an interest in the city's soap industry, though a barracks built by Yusuf in Tripoli later became the city's Soap Caravanserai (Khan al-Saboun). Instead of fostering commerce in Tripoli's well-positioned port with its easy access to the major cities of the Syrian interior, Yusuf committed acts discouraging foreign trade. One of the acts recorded by the sources was his confiscation of the gold, goods and cloth of two Venetian ships docked in Tripoli's harbor in 1623. Yusuf concocted evidence that the ships' crews were Maltese pirates and consequently had all eighty crew members beheaded on the shore. The Venetian consul in İzmir went to Tripoli to investigate, but was threatened by Yusuf's secret messengers that he would execute all the European residents in Tripoli if the investigation continued. According to al-Khalidi, no foreign ships docked at Tripoli after the incident. The eyalet under the Sayfas' underwent a gradual economic decline. In contrast, under Fakhr al-Din the ports of Beirut, Sidon and Acre thrived while agriculture prospered in the Galilee and the southern Lebanon. Upon his appointment to Tripoli in 1627, Fakhr al-Din planted thousands of mulberry trees to stimulate the eyalet's silk production. In the words of Salibi, Yusuf was "a poor manager of affairs", and lacked the imagination and energy of Fakhr al-Din, to whom he was indebted.

== Bibliography ==
- Abu-Husayn, Abdul-Rahim (1985). Provincial Leaderships in Syria, 1575–1650. Beirut: American University of Beirut. ISBN 9780815660729.
- Bakhit, Muhammad Adnan Salamah (February 1972). The Ottoman Province of Damascus in the Sixteenth Century (PhD). School of Oriental and African Studies, University of London.
- Griswold, William J. (1983). The Great Anatolian Rebellion, 1000–1020/1591–1611. Berlin: Klaus Schwarz. ISBN 3-922968-34-1.
- Harris, William (2012). Lebanon: A History, 600–2011. New York: Oxford University Press. ISBN 978-0-19-518111-1.
- Hourani, Alexander (2010). New Documents on the History of Mount Lebanon and Arabistan in the 10th and 11th Centuries H. Beirut.
- Salibi, Kamal S. (February 1973). "The Sayfās and the Eyalet of Tripoli 1579–1640". Arabica. 20 (1): 25–52. doi:10.1163/15700585-02001004. JSTOR 4056003. S2CID 247635304.
- Winter, Stefan (2010). The Shiites of Lebanon under Ottoman Rule, 1516–1788. Cambridge University Press. ISBN 9781139486811.
