= Battle of Ain Dara =

Battle between the Qaysi and Yamani tribo-political factions (1711)

- Part of the Qays–Yaman rivalry
| Date | 20 March 1711 |
| Location | Ain Dara, Sidon Eyalet, Ottoman Empire |
| Result | Qaysi victory: Qaysi political dominance of Mount Lebanon; Yamani Druze exodus to Jabal al-Druze |

Belligerents
| Qaysi faction; Shihab dynasty; Abu'l Lama clan of Matn; Talhuq clan of Gharb; Nakad clan of Manasif and Shahhar; Imad clan of Arqub; Abd al-Malik clan of Jurd; Khazen clan of Keserwan; Jumblatt clan of Chouf; Supported by: Harfush clan | Yamani faction; Alam al-Din clan; Arslan clan of Gharb; Sawaf clan of Matn; Supported by: Ottoman governors of Sidon and Damascus |

Commanders and leaders
| Emir Haydar Shihab; Sheikh Ali Jumblatt; Muhammad Talhuq; Sheikh Ali Abi Nakad; Sayyid Ahmad Imad; Janbulat Abd al-Malik; Khazen al-Khazen; Qabalan al-Qadi al-Tanukhi | Mahmoud Abu Harmoush (POW); Alam al-Din sheikhs †; Bashir Pasha al-Matarji; Nasuh Pasha Aydinli |

Casualties and losses
| N/A | Heavy |

The Battle of Ain Dara occurred in the village of Ain Dara, in Mount Lebanon in 1711, between the Qaysi and Yamani, two rival tribo-political factions.

The Qays were led by Emir Haydar of the Shihab dynasty and consisted of the Druze clans of Jumblatt, Imad, Nakad Talhuq, and Abd al-Malik and the Maronite clan of Khazen. The Yamani faction was led by Mahmoud Abu Harmoush and consisted of the Druze Alam al-Din, Arslan and Sawaf clans. The Yamani faction also had backing from the Ottoman provincial authorities of Sidon and Damascus.

The battle ended in a rout of the Yamani faction and resulted in the consolidation of Qaysi political and fiscal domination over Mount Lebanon. The battle's outcome also precipitated a mass migration of pro-Yamani Druze nobility and peasants from Mount Lebanon to the eastern Hauran, in a mountainous area today known as Jabal al-Druze, solidifying the Maronite Christian population as the predominant populace in Mount Lebanon.

== Background ==
In 17th-century Mount Lebanon, the Druze were the major demographic group of the region. The Druze had been divided into political factions based on the old Arab tribal divisions of the Qays and Yaman. The Ma'ans, whose emirs (princes) consistently held the tax farms of Mount Lebanon's districts (Chouf, Matn, Keserwan, Gharb and Jurd), represented the Qaysi faction, along with their allies, the Druze clans of Jumblatt, Imad, Nakad, Talhuq and Abu'l Lama, the Maronite Khazen clan of Keserwan, and the Sunni Muslim Shihab clan of Wadi al-Taym. Leading the Yamani faction was the Druze Alam al-Din clan, whose members occasionally gained the tax farms of Mount Lebanon during times of conflict between the Ma'ans and the Ottoman authorities. Other families belonging to the Yamani faction were the Druze clans of Arslan and Sawaf.

In 1697, Emir Ahmad Ma'an died without a male heir, and as a result, the Druze sheikhs of the Qaysi faction, including sheikh Ali Jumblatt and sheikh Ali Abi Nakad, decided to appoint a strong and unifying family to head the faction to prevent a potential Yamani rise to power. The Qaysi sheikhs ultimately chose Bashir Shihab I to succeed Emir Ahmad due to the military strength of the Shihab clan, their distance from the intra-Qaysi disputes, and their marital kinship with Emir Ahmad (Bashir was Ahmad's maternal nephew). The Ottoman authorities confirmed the Ma'an-Shihab transition, but decided to invest Emir Ahmad's tax farms to Emir Haydar Shihab (Emir Ahmad's grandson). Due to Emir Haydar's youth, Emir Bashir served as regent. Emir Bashir strengthened Qaysi dominance in Mount Lebanon and installed the Qaysi sheikh Umar al-Zaydani of the Sunni Muslim Zaydani clan as the tax farmer of Safad and its region, while securing the allegiance of the Shia Muslim Sa'b and Munkir clans of Jabal Amil (the Wa'il clan of Jabal Amil was pro-Yamani).

After Emir Bashir died, the Ottomans rescinded the power of the Shihabs in Jabal Amil (the Munkirs and Sa'bs then defected to the pro-Yamani coalition) and the Galilee. Moreover, in 1709, the Ottoman governor of Sidon Eyalet, which included Mount Lebanon, Beirut, Galilee and Jabal Amil, deposed Emir Haydar from the tax farm of Chouf and transferred to it Emir Haydar's erstwhile associate-turned-enemy, Mahmoud Abu Harmoush. Abu Harmoush joined forces with the Alam al-Din-led Yamani faction and the latter soon after gained dominance in Mount Lebanon. However, the popular support for the Yamani faction in Chouf was not deep. Abu Harmoush, with the backing of Sidon's governor, pursued Emir Haydar, who had since fled to Ghazir where he found protection from the Maronite Hubaysh clan. Ghazir was plundered and Emir Haydar fled northeast to Hermel in the northern Beqaa Valley.

=== Prelude ===
The Qaysi clans of Mount Lebanon sent appeals to Emir Haydar to return and restore their control over the region. Buoyed by the Qaysi rallying of support, Emir Haydar relocated to Matn in 1711 where he sought safe haven with the Abu'l Lama, who controlled the subdistrict. Emir Haydar and the Abu'l Lama mobilized their forces at the village of Ras al-Matn, where they were soon joined by the heads of the various Qaysi clans of Mount Lebanon and their forces. They included Sheikh Ali Jumblatt, Qabalan al-Qadi al-Tanukhi, Sayyid Ahmad Imad, Sheikh Ali Abi Nakad, Janbulat Abd al-Malik and Muhammad Talhuq. Hearing of the Qaysi mobilization, Abu Harmoush called on the Yamani nobles of the Alam al-Din and Arslan clans to mobilize at the Jurd village of Ain Dara, and they were also joined by the Shia Muslim Harfush clan of the Beqaa Valley.

== Battle ==
The Ottoman governor of Sidon sent troops through Beirut to aid the Yamani coalition, while the governor of Damascus did the same, but his troops were led through the Beqaa Valley. Through these maneuvers, the Ottoman provincial authorities and the Yamani faction intended to launch a pincer assault against the Qaysi camp at Ras al-Matn. However, on 20 March, Emir Haydar launched an all-out assault against the Yamani camp at Ain Dara to preempt the arrival of Ottoman reinforcements and being subsequently attacked from different directions. In the ensuing battle, the Qaysi coalition dealt a blow to the Yamani camp, which suffered heavy casualties. Seven sheikhs of the Alam al-Din clan were killed, while Abu Harmoush was captured. Emir Haydar subsequently sent kind-worded notices to the governors of Sidon and Damascus, who ultimately accepted the Qaysi victory and withdrew their forces.

== Role of Harfush clan ==
In 1711, French consular reports suggest, Husayn Harfush gave shelter to Haydar Shihabi and then supplied 2,500 troops to help him wipe out his Druze rivals at ‘Ain Dara and establish himself as sole emir of the Chouf. This is curiously not addressed by H. A. al-Shihabi or any other chronicles of the period.

In the assessment of Stefan Winter, "the Harfushes do not seem to have joined the Hamadas who had already been at war with the vali of Tripoli for nearly a year. Instead, they gave emir Haydar al-Shihabi refuge when it became clear that the state intended to replace him with a rival Druze household, and provided 2,500 troops to enable him to crush his enemies and establish the Shihabi as the sole tribal ruler ship of Sidon."

== Aftermath ==
The Qaysi victory at Ain Dara led to major political, social and demographic changes in Mount Lebanon. The Yamani faction was removed as a political force in Mount Lebanon, and Emir Haydar proceeded to reorganize the local leadership of the region, distributing muqata'at (tax collection districts, sing. muqata'a) to his Qaysi partisans in the various subdistricts of Mount Lebanon. He confirmed his allies as the leaders of their home districts and promoted them to higher social ranks. Thus, the Abu'l Lama sheikhs of Matn became emirs, joining the ranks of the Shihabs and Arslans. Jumblatt authority, normally centered in the Chouf, was extended to Jezzin and southern Mount Lebanon. The Nakad being already ranked sheikhs cemented their authority on the Manasif, Shahhar and a third of Iqlim al-Kharrub muqata'a. Imad, and Abd al-Malik leaders were confirmed as the muqata'jis (tax farm holders) of the Arqub and Jurd muqata'at, respectively. The Talhuq and Abd al-Malik clan leaders were promoted to the rank of sheikhs, and the Talhuq clan leaders were given the upper part of the Arslan's muqata'a of Gharb, while the Arslans were kept in the lower Gharb. The Arslans had their muqata'a reduced because of their allegiance with the Yamani faction. However, they were permitted by Emir Haydar to remain in Mount Lebanon. Emir Haydar did not sublease his holdings at Deir al-Qamar, Ain Dara, Batloun, Niha and Ammatour, preferring to keep these key villages under his direct fiscal authority. In the northern Keserwan district of Mount Lebanon, Emir Haydar confirmed the Maronite Khazen and Hubaysh sheikhs as muqata'jis.

The defeat of the Alam al-Din clan at Ain Dara consolidated the power of the Shihab dynasty in Mount Lebanon, to the point that it became an "established custom in the land of the Druze that no one would raise a weapon against a Shihabi emir unless he had another [Shihabi] emir with him", according to Mishaqa. Nonetheless, Shihabi power was dependent on their alliances and patronage networks with various Druze clans. The Qaysi victory also strengthened the hand of the Shihabs' allies, the Shia Hamade of the Tripoli hinterland. The Hamade sheikhs were the landlords of the Maronite-dominant areas of Byblos, Batroun and Bsharri. Like the Shihab emirs, the Hamade muqaddams (a social rank higher than sheikh, but lower than emir) were virtually left to their own devices by the governors of Tripoli as long as the latter were paid the annual taxes of the region. Though the Yamani faction was eliminated, a new rivalry gradually emerged among the remaining Druze clans consisting of the Jumblatti and Yazbaki factions; the former was led by its namesake, Sheikh Ali Jumblatt, and the latter was led Sheikh Abd al-Salam Yazbak Imad. Each took sides with different Shihabi emirs contesting control of the emirate in the years following Emir Haydar's death in 1732. The rivalry escalated after the resignation of Haydar's eldest son and successor, Emir Mulhim Shihab.

With the exception of the Arslans, Emir Haydar forced the Yamani Druze to leave Mount Lebanon, leading to a mass exodus to the Hauran region south of Damascus, where a previous wave of Druze from Mount Lebanon had begun settling in 1685. In the Druze emigrants' place came Maronite peasants from the region of Tripoli, to the north of Mount Lebanon. While Christian growth in the region was a long-term trend, the Yamani Druze exodus significantly contributed to a demographic shift in Mount Lebanon, with Maronites and other Christians, namely from the Greek Orthodox and Melkite sects, making up a large share of the population at the expense of the Druze. Nonetheless, the Druze muqata'jis remained the major political power, and Maronites, Melkites and Greek Orthodox Christians increasingly became the tenant farmers of the mostly Druze landlords of Mount Lebanon.

== See also ==
- List of conflicts in the Near East

== Bibliography ==
- Abu Izzeddin, Nejla M. (1993). The Druzes: A New Study of Their History, Faith, and Society. Brill. ISBN 9789004097056.
- Harris, William (2012). Lebanon: A History, 600-2011. Oxford University Press. ISBN 9780195181111.
- Mishaqa, Mikhail (1988). Thackston, Wheeler McIntosh (ed.). Murder, Mayhem, Pillage, and Plunder: The History of the Lebanon in the 18th and 19th Centuries by Mikhayil Mishaqa (1800-1873). State University of New York Press. ISBN 9780887067129.
