= Ahmad Ma'n =

Aḥmad ibn Mulḥim ibn Yunus Maʾn

Emir of the Druze

Tax farmer of Chouf, Matn, Gharb, and Jurd
- In office 1667–1697

Personal details
- Died: 1697
- Parent: Mulhim Ma'n (father)
- Relatives: Fakhr al-Din II (granduncle); Qurqumaz (brother)

Aḥmad ibn Mulḥim ibn Yunus Maʾn (Arabic: أحمد بن ملحم بن يونس معن) was the paramount emir of the Druze in Mount Lebanon and the tax farmer of the subdistricts of the Chouf, Matn, Gharb and Jurd from 1667 until his death in 1697. He was the last member of the Ma'n dynasty, after which paramount leadership passed to his marital relatives from the Shihab dynasty.

== Sources ==
Unlike his granduncle Fakhr al-Din II (see below), who has been considerably studied by historians, Ahmad has received scant attention in the historical sources. Most of the information about him in historical literature derives from the chronicle Tarikh al-Azmina by the 17th-century Maronite patriarch and historian, Istifan al-Duwayhi. Duwayhi was a friend and protégé of Ahmad and left his northern Lebanon headquarters to take refuge with Ahmad for two years, due to what Duwayhi termed "the oppression of [the Maronite] muqaddams (rural chiefs) of Jubbat Bsharri and the disagreement among the [Maronite] shaykhs of Kisrawan". According to the modern historian Abdul-Rahim Abu-Husayn, Duwayhi's personal relations with Ahmad and the favor historically granted to the Maronite Church by Ahmad's Ma'n dynasty made him "naturally keen" on depicting Ahmad and the Ma'ns "in the best possible light".

Duwayhi's bias was likely the reason less favorable events involving Ahmad were omitted or altered in his account. On the other hand, the modern historian William Harris considers Abu-Husayn's "devaluing" of Duwayhi's account to be "problematic" and considers Duwayhi to be credible about events contemporary to his lifetime. Another source, Haydar al-Shihabi, the 19th-century local chronicler, was a grandson of Haydar Shihab, who was a grandson of Ahmad. In the local chronicles, few events are recorded in Ahmad's career, showing a stable and peaceful thirty-year reign as the hereditary multazim (holder of an iltizam, or limited-term tax farm) of most of Mount Lebanon. Contemporary Ottoman government records uncovered in the 20th century have provided considerable information about Ahmad's activities, showing significantly more instability and interruption of his rule.

== Family background ==
Ahmad was one of two sons of Mulhim Ma'n, the other son being Qurqumaz. Their Ma'n dynasty historically provided the paramount chiefs of the Druze and the multazims of the Chouf area of southern Mount Lebanon. The Ma'nid emir Fakhr al-Din II expanded their power far beyond the Chouf and in the early 17th century became the strongman over large parts of the Levant. During this period, he and his brother, Ahmad's grandfather Yunus, and other Ma'ns held the governorships and iltizam of the Sidon-Beirut (Mount Lebanon and the ports of Sidon and Beirut) and Safed (Galilee, Jabal Amil and port of Acre) sanjaks, as well as several neighboring areas, including most of the Tripoli Eyalet and the Baalbek nahiya. In an Ottoman military campaign to destroy Ma'nid power in 1633, Yunus and several Ma'nids were killed and Fakhr al-Din was arrested and executed two years later.

Mulhim evaded capture and after defeating the Ma'ns' rivals for Druze leadership from the Alam al-Din dynasty, regained the iltizam of the Chouf, Matn, Jurd and Gharb nahiyas (subdistricts), which collectively formed the so-called 'Druze Mountain' area of Sidon-Beirut.

== Rule and rebellion ==
=== Paramountcy over the Druze ===
Ahmad and Qurqumaz succeeded their father as the paramount chiefs of the Druze after his death in 1658. At roughly that point, they were also appointed to the iltizam of the Safed Sanjak, holding it until late 1660. Their leadership over the Mount Lebanon Druze was challenged by other Druze chiefs with backing from the Ottoman government, which launched an expedition against the Ma'ns' allies, the Shia Muslim Hamada chiefs in northern Mount Lebanon and the Sunni Muslim Shihab emirs of Wadi al-Taym in 1660. The campaign was carried out by the troops of the sultan led by Grand Vizier Koprulu Mehmed Pasha and the governor of Sidon Eyalet, an administrative entity formed that year out of the Sidon-Beirut and Safed sanjaks to strengthen government control and taxation efforts of the Druze-dominated region. The troops wreaked havoc in the countryside but were unable to locate the rebel chiefs and expanded their targets to include the Ma'nid brothers when they refused to cooperate in handing over their allies. The rival Druze leaders Ali Alam al-Din and Sirhal Imad were appointed to the iltizam formerly held by Mulhim, while the Ma'nid brothers took refuge in the Kisrawan. In 1662, the brothers were allegedly lured into a trap when Sidon's governor invited them to meet with his representative to reinstate them to their iltizam. In the ensuing meeting, Qurqumaz was slain, but Ahmad evaded capture.

Afterward, Ahmad mobilized his Druze warriors against his Druze rivals. In the ensuing conflict, Ahmad is held to have represented the 'Qays' faction, while the Alam al-Din emir led the 'Yaman'; these divisions alluded to the early Islamic-period Qays–Yaman tribo-political rivalry, but there was no actual known connection to that centuries-old feud. (Note: Before the time of Ahmad, the Qays–Yaman phenomenon is attested in contemporary sources elsewhere in the Levant, namely in the vicinity of Damascus and the mountains of Nablus in the 16th century, and by Duwayhi in the Hauran and among the Maronites of Aqoura in the 14th and 16th centuries, respectively. Local Druze chroniclers of the late 15th and early 16th century, namely Salih ibn Yahya and Ibn Sibat, do not mention it, neither does Fakhr al-Din's court historian al-Khalidi al-Safadi (d. 1625). One mention is made by a supposedly contemporary, anonymous author who described Fakhr al-Din as being welcomed by his supporters from the "Banu Qays" when he visited the region by boat during his Italian exile in 1613–1618. Duwayhi, on the other hand, refers to the rivals of the Ma'ns in Fakhr al-Din's time as "Yamani" on a number of occasions. Duwayhi mentioned clashes by the Yamani Druze of the Chouf, Gharb, Matn and Jurd and the Qaysi Maronites and Druze of the Kisrawan in 1636, one year after Fakhr al-Din's death. Abu-Husayn thus concludes the rivalry was either non-existent or insignificant among the Druze before the days of Ahmad.) In a battle close to Beirut in 1667, Ahmad and the Qays routed the Yamani Druze led by the Alam al-Dins and the Sawwafs of the Matn, prompting them to leave Mount Lebanon for refuge in Damascus.

=== Multazim of southern Mount Lebanon ===
After his victory that year, Ahmad assumed control over the iltizam formerly held by his father comprising the Chouf, Jurd, Matn, Gharb and the mostly Maronite Kisrawan.

In 1689 the Ottoman imperial government issued a call up of troops from the governors and military commanders of the Syrian eyalets to the war front with Hungary, threatening those officials who failed to cooperate with execution as infidels. The seriousness of the orders was unprecedented, as was the invocation in the orders of the Ottoman sultan's role as caliph, and reflected the dire state of the Ottoman military due to the war with the Hungarian Habsburgs. The Ottoman assault on Vienna had been repulsed in 1683 and the ensuing war caused a major drain on the empire's military resources and their increasing retreat from Hungarian territory. Ahmad was ordered to dispatch 500 musketeers to the imperial camp at Edirne and was addressed in complementary terms as the "abode" of the "emirate". Ahmad evidently did not comply, as there are no indications to that effect in the local chronicles or the government records.

Ahmad was issued orders two years later, this time to help the governors of Tripoli and Damascus stamp out the rebellion of the Hamada sheikhs, who are only referred to in government records as Kizilbash or Revafid, both derogatory terms used by the Ottomans for Shia Muslims, the former meant to associate them with pro-Safavid Persian rebels. The Hamadas, who were the multazims of Byblos, Jubbat Bsharri and Batroun, had commenced their rebellion in the hill country around Tripoli while the Ottomans were smarting from their losses on the Hungarian front in the 1680s. They had attacked the Citadel of Tripoli in 1684, raided Byblos around 1686 and all the while inflicted heavy casualties on government forces. Although the Ottomans were able to kill several in a 1693 expedition, many of the Hamadas and their fighters escaped and found refuge with Ahmad. With the latter's assistance, they repulsed the Ottoman troops who pursued them into the Druze Mountain, killing many soldiers. In response to Ahmad's protection of the Hamadas, the imperial government ordered the mobilization of the troops of the Tripoli and Sidon eyalets and those of the Hama, Homs and Kilis sanjaks to capture and execute Ahmad and his men and send their heads to the capital at Constantinople in 1694. Nothing evidently came of this order.

Between 1694 and 1695, numerous imperial orders were issued to officers of the Syrian provinces to capture and kill Ahmad for his persisting alliance with the Hamadas. In May 1695, the imperial authorities formally voided Ahmad's control of his iltizam, which by then also included the nahiyas of Iqlim al-Kharrub and Marj Uyun to the south of the Druze Mountain. The same order called for the provincial governors of Tripoli, Sidon and Damascus, as well as commanders from Aleppo to remove and punish Ahmad and the Hamadas. Ahmad consequently fled his Chouf stronghold for refuge with the Shihabs in Wadi al-Taym. Ahmad had formed marital ties with the family in 1674, when he married his daughter to Musa Shihab of Hasbaya; his paternal aunt was married to Husayn Shihab of Rashayya in 1629.

Upon vacating his iltizam, his Druze rival Musa Alam al-Din, who had been based in Damascus, was installed by the Ottomans in his place at Deir al-Qamar, the traditional seat of Ma'nid power in the Chouf. Ahmad and the Shihabs sponsored risings against Musa, compelling him to flee the Druze Mountain for Sidon where he had the governor's protection. Ahmad subsequently returned to Deir al-Qamar and resumed control of his iltizam. The Ottoman government, which did not approve of Ahmad's practical rule, ordered different Syrian provincial governors to help reinstate Musa, who remained the legal multazim, and afterward reduce the tax burden on the Druze Mountain to boost his popularity there.

=== Last years and death ===
Despite numerous government attempts throughout the 1690s, Ahmad consistently evaded capture or punishment. Abu-Husayn proposes this was related to the deployment of most Ottoman government troops to the Hungarian front and the consequent lack of sufficient forces to effect imperial orders against Ahmad. The English traveler Henry Maundrell, when visiting Beirut in March 1697, noted that Ahmad was known to remain constantly on guard for his life, writing:

Their [the Druzes'] present prince is Achmet, grandson to Faccardine; an old man, and one who keeps up the custom of his ancestors, of turning day into night: a hereditary practice in his family, proceeding from a traditional persuasion among them that princes never sleep securely but by day, when men's actions and designs are best observed by their guards, and if need be, most easily prevented; but that in the night it concerns them to be always vigilant, lest the darkness, aided by their sleep, should give traitors both opportunity and encouragement to assault their persons, and by dagger or pistol, to make them continue their sleep longer than when they intended.

He died of old age in his sleep in Deir al-Qamar on 25 September 1697. His son Mulhim had died as a young boy in 1680, and Ahmad died without male progeny.

== Succession of the Shihabs ==
Ahmad was the last Ma'nid emir and his death marked the end of nearly two hundred years of Ma'nid dominance of the Druze Mountain. In the immediate aftermath, the sheikhs of the Qaysi families of the Druze Mountain and probably the Maronite sheikhs in the Kisrawan convened and chose Bashir Shihab, the son of Husayn Shihab and Ahmad's Ma'nid aunt, as their paramount leader and the holder of Ahmad's iltizam. While the granting of iltizam was an Ottoman government prerogative, the authorities in Constantinople and Sidon evidently accepted the local initiative. There is no indication in the official records that Bashir's control of the iltizam was sanctioned until 1706, after his death. The government, having contended with nearly two centuries of frequent Druze rebellions and over two decades of a disastrous war effort in Hungary, was probably unable to effectively tend to such matters in Mount Lebanon. There are multiple reasons Bashir Shihab was chosen, the main one being his kinship with Ahmad and the Ma'ns. The Druze may have also sought to choose a Sunni Muslim as their representative to elicit favor from the Sunni Ottomans. The Druze sheikhs' internal rivalries may have prevented the selection of one of their own and Bashir was thus considered as a suitable and neutral outsider. Further, such an outsider would naturally be dependent on the sheikhs' favor to rule

In the 1706 government record, the authorities acknowledge that Ahmad had been in control of the iltizam and that with his death, Bashir assumed the legal deeds and unpaid arrears left by Ahmad, which he did not forward to the government, and that Haydar Shihab, the grandson of Ahmad by the marriage of his daughter to Musa Shihab, was to be granted the iltizam on the condition that he pay the outstanding arrears. In a different government order, Haydar is referred to "as the best and most straightforward of the descendants of Ibn Ma'n". Following the victory of Haydar and the Qays over the Yamani Druze and the elimination of the Alam al-Din emirs at the Battle of Ain Dara in 1711, all succeeding holders of the iltizam of the Druze Mountain and the Kisrawan were Haydar's direct descendants until the demise of Shihab rule in 1841.

== Bibliography ==
- Abu-Husayn, Abdul-Rahim (1998). "The Shihab Succession (1697): A Reconsideration". Archiv Orientální. 8: 9–16. ISSN 0044-8699.
- Abu-Husayn, A. R. (1999). "The Unknown Career of Ahmad Ma'n (1667-1697)". Archivum Ottomanicum. 17: 241–247.
- Abu-Husayn, Abdul-Rahim (1985). Provincial Leaderships in Syria, 1575–1650. Beirut: American University of Beirut. ISBN 9780815660729.
- Abu-Husayn, Abdul-Rahim (2004). The View from Istanbul: Ottoman Lebanon and the Druze Emirate. I.B.Tauris. ISBN 9781860648564.
- Harris, William (2012). Lebanon: A History, 600–2011. New York: Oxford University Press. ISBN 978-0-19-518111-1.
- Hourani, Alexander (2010). New Documents on the History of Mount Lebanon and Arabistan in the 10th and 11th Centuries H. Beirut.
- Salibi, K. (1973). "The Secret of the House of Ma'n". International Journal of Middle East Studies. 4 (3): 272–287. doi:10.1017/S0020743800031469. JSTOR 162160. S2CID 163020137.
