= Druze revolt =

Druze revolt can refer to the following:

- Druze power struggle (1658–1667)
- 1838 Druze revolt
- 1860 Lebanon conflict
- 1895 Druze rebellion
- Hauran Druze rebellion (1909–1910)
- Great Syrian Revolt (1925–1927)
- 1954 Druze revolt
- Druze insurgency in Southern Syria (2025–present)
