= Alam al-Din dynasty =

Lebanese noble family

The Alam al-Dins, also spelled Alamuddin or Alameddine, were a Druze family that intermittently held or contested the paramount chieftainship of the Druze districts of Mount Lebanon in opposition to the Ma'n and Shihab families in the late 17th and early 18th centuries during Ottoman rule. Their origins were obscure, with different accounts claiming or proposing Tanukhid or Ma'nid ancestry. From at least the early 17th century, they were the traditional leaders of the Yaman faction among the Druzes, which stood in opposition to the Qays, led by the Tanukhid Buhturs, traditional chiefs of the Gharb area south of Beirut, and the Ma'ns. A likely chief of the family, Muzaffar al-Andari, led the Druze opposition to the powerful Ma'nid leader Fakhr al-Din II until reconciling with him in 1623.

The Alam al-Dins' first definitive appearance in the historical record was in 1633 under their chief Ali, who was appointed by the Ottomans to replace Fakhr al-Din as the tax farmer and paramount chief of the Druze districts. Ali soon after exterminated the Ma'ns' Buhturid allies. Although he lost control of the Chouf district to the Ma'ns in 1636, Ali retained control of the remaining Druze districts of the Gharb, Jurd and Matn until his death in 1660. He was succeeded by his sons Muhammad and Mansur, who lost the districts to the Ma'ns under Fakhr al-Din's grandnephew Ahmad in 1667. The family retired to Damascus or the Hauran and, under Muhammad's son Musa, unsuccessfully attempted to recapture the chieftainship of the Mount Lebanon Druze in 1693, 1698, and 1711. On the last occasion, they were defeated and killed by the Shihabs and the Qays at the Battle of Ain Dara. Before the end of the 18th century, surviving members of the family relocated to Baaqlin in the Chouf, while others settled in Hasbaya in Wadi al-Taym and Suwayda in the Hauran.

== Origins ==
The origins of the Alam al-Din family are uncertain. The historian Kamal Salibi proposed that the family was possibly descended from Alam al-Din Sulayman, one of a number of chiefs of the Druze Ma'n dynasty mentioned by the local Druze chronicler Ibn Sibat (d. 1521) as a chieftain of the Chouf in 1518; the other Ma'nid chief was Qurqumaz ibn Yunis, the ancestor of Fakhr al-Din II. Salibi argued that the omission of Alam al-Din Sulayman from later local histories, namely the works of Ahmad al-Khalidi (d. 1624) and Istifan al-Duwayhi (d. 1704) was due to those historians close association with the Ma'nid descendants of Qurqumaz, who may have sought to void competing Alam al-Din claims to the paramount leadership of the Druze enjoyed by the Qurqumaz line. The 19th-century local histories of Haydar al-Shihabi and Tannus al-Shidyaq, the first a member and the second an agent of the Ma'n's marital relatives and successors, the Shihab dynasty, may have had a similar interest in omitting the Alam al-Dins' possible Ma'nid origins. The Alam al-Dins posed a serious challenge to the Shihabs' paramount leadership of the Druze in Mount Lebanon until the demise of the Alam al-Dins in 1711.

Shidyaq traced the origins of the Alam al-Dins to a certain 14th-century Tanukhid chieftain of the village of Ramtun in the Gharb, Alam al-Din Sulayman ibn Ghallab, who is mentioned by the Buhturid chronicler Salih ibn Yahya (d. 1435). Although Shidyaq's version was accepted by the historians Henri Lammens and Philip K. Hitti, Salibi considered it "confused and entirely unconvincing ... pure fancy". Research by Alexander Hourani, based on the Sijill al-Arslani (genealogical records of the Arslan family of Choueifat), holds that the Alam al-Dins were descendants of Alam al-Din Ma'n ibn Mu'attib, a descendant of the Abd Allah ibn al-Nu'man ibn Malik branch of the Tanukh confederation; the Arslans are purported descendants of Raslan ibn Malik, the uncle of Abd Allah ibn al-Nu'man. The Sijill al-Arslani dates the arrival of the Alam al-Din and Arslan families in Mount Lebanon to the late 8th century. The Alam al-Dins had marital ties with the Arslans, as well as the Buhturids, which was also a Tanukhid family. The historian William Harris considers Salibi's theory of Ma'nid ancestry of the Alam al-Dins to be without evidence. He notes that the Alam al-Dins' likely Tanukhid ancestry gave them enough traditional authority to claim rights of chieftainship over the Druze.

=== Muzaffar al-Andari of the Jurd ===
The Alam al-Dins moved from Ramtun to Ain Dara in the Jurd in the 16th century. A certain Druze muqaddam (local chieftain) "Alam al-Din" of the Matn, a Druze district bordering the Jurd to the north, is mentioned in Ottoman documents as having surrendered his muskets and defected to the Ottomans during their 1585 expedition against Qurqumaz Ma'n and his Druze warriors. The preeminent chieftain of the Jurd in the early 17th century, Shaykh Muzaffar al-Andari, was likely a member of the Alam al-Din. Hourani notes that he was "apparently identical" to the Muzaffar ibn Salah al-Din Yusuf ibn Zahr al-Din Husayn ibn Nur al-Din Ishaq Alam al-Din mentioned in the Sijill al-Arslani as the brother-in-law of an Arslan chief.

Muzaffar was among the early Druze opponents of the governor of Sidon-Beirut and Safad, the powerful Ma'nid chief Fakhr al-Din. He provided key military assistance to the army of the governor of Damascus, Hafiz Ahmed Pasha, and the Sayfas during their invasion of the Ma'n-dominated Chouf in 1613. Muzaffar and Husayn Sayfa burned and looted several villages in the Chouf, but were stopped by Hafiz Ahmed Pasha from completing the burning of the Ma'nid seat of Deir al-Qamar. Fakhr al-Din fled to Europe on that occasion, remaining there for the next five years. In that year Muzaffar was transferred the tax farms of the Jurd, Keserwan, Matn, Gharb, and Shahhar districts, all of which were held previously by Fakhr al-Din or his proxies. He held onto the tax farms in 1614. According to Salibi, Shaykh Muzaffar led the Yaman faction, composed of the Arslans under Muhammad ibn Jamal al-Din and the Druze Sawwaf family chiefs of Shbaniyya in the Matn. The Yaman stood in opposition to the Qays led by the Buhturs and the Ma'ns.

The Ma'n regained the good graces of the Ottomans by 1616 and used the momentum to confront their Druze rivals. Muzaffar, the Sawwafs and the son of Muhammad ibn Jamal al-Din, backed by the Sayfas, were routed by the Ma'n led by Fakhr al-Din's son Ali and brother Yunis in four August engagements at Naimeh near Beirut, Abeih in the Gharb, and Ighmid and Ain Dara, both in the Jurd. Fakhr al-Din returned in 1618 and launched an offensive against the Sayfas, with whom Muzaffar had taken refuge after the 1616 defeats. He was holed up in the Krak des Chevaliers with Yusuf Sayfa when Fakhr al-Din besieged the fortress in 1619. Muzaffar reconciled with Fakhr al-Din in December 1619 / January 1620 and was appointed by him his subordinate chieftain in the Jurd. Fakhr al-Din's reasoning for reinstating Muzaffar in the Jurd was because Muzaffar "was originally from there and his ancestors had long been its governors", according to Khalidi. He joined Fakhr al-Din's coalition in the major Battle of Anjar in 1623, in which the governor of Damascus was routed and captured.

== Paramount chiefs of the Druze ==
=== Chieftainship of Ali ===
The first mention of Ali Alam al-Din in the sources was by Duwayhi in 1633. Duwayhi notes Ali was the leader of the Yaman faction of the Druze (opponents of the Qays faction headed by the Tanukh and Ma'n families). In that year he was appointed by the Ottomans to replace Fakhr al-Din of the Ma'n as the multazim (tax farmer) of the Druze Mountain, i.e. the predominantly Druze districts of the Chouf, Gharb, Jurd and Matn in southern Mount Lebanon. Fakhr al-Din had been captured in an Ottoman military expedition and imprisoned in Constantinople. Ali proceeded soon after to kill Fakhr al-Din's allies, the Tanukh chiefs of Abeih in the Gharb, Yahya al-Aqil, Sayf al-Din, Nasir al-Din and Mahmud, and their three young children, thereby eliminating the Tanukh family. They were replaced as the leaders of the Qays Druze by Fakhr al-Din's nephew Mulhim Ma'n, who led the opposition to Ali and the Yaman.

In 1635 Ali and his Druze ally Zayn al-Din Sawwaf supported Ali Sayfa in his struggle to gain control of Tripoli from his uncle Assaf Sayfa in 1635. After initial successes, which saw Ali Sayfa regain control of Tripoli city, Byblos, and Batroun, the allies fought a bloody stalemate against Assaf before being expelled from the Tripoli Eyalet in 1636. Assaf and the Janissaries of Damascus launched an offensive later that year against Ali for backing Ali Sayfa and failing to remit owed taxes from his Mount Lebanon tax farms. Ali and Ali Sayfa were then driven out of southern Mount Lebanon by the Qaysi Druze and holed themselves up in the Arqa fortress near Tripoli. There they were defeated again by Assaf and the Damascene Janissaries. However, after their defeat Ali Sayfa and Assaf reconciled under mediation by the Al Fadl tribe and the two Sayfas subsequently escorted Ali back to Beirut to resume his leadership position.

By 1636 Mulhim had gained control of the Chouf, though Ali retained his chieftainship over the Gharb, Jurd, and Matn. Ali continued to control these districts at the time of Mulhim's death in 1658, by which time Mulhim's tax farms had expanded to the Safad Sanjak (e.g. the Galilee and Jabal Amil) and Batroun. Mulhim was succeeded in his tax farms and leadership of the Qays by his son Ahmad.

=== Chieftainship of Muhammad ===
Ali died in 1660 and was succeeded by his sons Muhammad and Mansur. The former became the paramount chief of the Druze-dominated southern Mount Lebanon in 1662. The following year Mansur defeated a Qaysi Druze force at Adma. In 1667 Ahmad Ma'n defeated the Alam al-Dins in a battle outside of Beirut and took over their domains across the Druze districts and Keserwan. After their 1667 defeat the Alam al-Din chiefs resettled in Damascus and became politically inactive in Mount Lebanon.

In 1669–1671, Muhammad held the tax farm for the village of Hubran near modern Suwayda in the Hauran, according to Ottoman tax records. Druze oral tradition in the Hauran recorded in the 20th century holds that the Alam al-Din chiefs led two hundred men and their families from Mount Lebanon to settle the Hauran in 1685, the first major wave of Druze migration to the area.

=== Attempts to return and demise under Musa ===
According to the history of Duwayhi, in 1693, a son of Muhammad, Musa, successfully petitioned the Sublime Porte (imperial Ottoman government) in Constantinople for a commission to evict and replace Ahmad Ma'n. With Ottoman backing, he forced Ahmad out of Deir al-Qamar, but shortly after he withdrew to Damascus and Ahmad was restored to his seat. Firmans from the Porte dated June 1694 and May 1695 appointed "the prominent emir, Musa Alam al-Din" to replace Ahmad in the latter's tax farms. In June 1695, another firman noted that Musa fled his Mount Lebanon districts while he was collecting taxes due to attacks by the Ma'ns and the Ma'ns' non-Druze marital relatives, the Shihabs of Wadi al-Taym. The firman orders the governor of Sidon Eyalet to restore Musa to his position and suppress the Ma'ns and Shihabs.

Ahmad died in 1697 without a male heir. His chieftainship was inherited by his non-Druze marital relatives, the Shihabs of Wadi al-Taym. At Ahmad's death Musa again attempted to replace his successor, Bashir Shihab I, by order of the Sublime Porte, but the Ottomans denied his request. The Yamani Druze of Mount Lebanon led by Mahmoud Abi Harmoush of Samqaniyeh revolted against Bashir's successor and cousin, Haydar Shihab, in 1709–1711. Under Abi Harmoush's auspices Musa returned to Mount Lebanon with his kinsmen and supporters to lead the revolt and attempt to take over the paramount chieftainship of the Mount Lebanon Druze. The Shihabs and their Qaysi supporters routed the Alam al-Dins and the Yaman in the Battle of Ain Dara in 1711, which ended with the deaths of Musa and six other Alam al-Din chiefs. Their defeat precipitated a mass migration of Yamani Druze to the Hauran. There, the Alam al-Dins were succeeded as the chiefs of the Druze by their associates, the Hamdan family.

Although the general consensus among historians is that the family was exterminated in the Battle of Ain Dara, Sami Swayd's Historical Dictionary of the Druzes holds that surviving members of the Alam al-Din fled to Baaqlin in the Chouf, and a number of them relocated from there to Hasbaya in Wadi al-Taym. By the end of the 18th century, part of the Alam al-Dins moved to Suwayda. Swayd's dictionary holds that in the present day members of the family also live in Jordan, Europe, Australia, and the Americas.

== Bibliography ==
- Abu-Husayn, Abdul-Rahim (1985). Provincial Leaderships in Syria, 1575–1650. Beirut: American University of Beirut. ISBN 9780815660729.
- Abu-Husayn, Abdul-Rahim (2004). The View from Istanbul: Lebanon and the Druze Emirate in the Ottoman Chancery Documents, 1546–1711. Oxford and New York: The Centre for Lebanese Studies and I. B. Tauris. ISBN 1-86064-856-8.
- Firro, Kais (1992). A History of the Druzes. Leiden: Brill. ISBN 90-04-09437-7.
- Harris, William (2012). Lebanon: A History, 600–2011. New York: Oxford University Press. ISBN 978-0-19-518-111-1.
- Hourani, Alexander (2010). New Documents on the History of Mount Lebanon and Arabistan in the 10th and 11th Centuries H. Beirut.
- Salibi, Kamal S. (July 1973). "The Secret of the House of Ma'n". International Journal of Middle East Studies. 4 (3): 272–287. doi:10.1017/S0020743800031469. JSTOR 162160. S2CID 163020137.
- Swayd, Sami (2015). Historical Dictionary of the Druzes (Second ed.). Lanham, Maryland: Rowman and Littlefield. ISBN 978-1-4422-4616-4.
