= Sawwaf family =

Al-Sawwaf (Arabic: الصوَّاف) were a Druze family of chiefs active in Mount Lebanon and Wadi al-Taym in the late 15th–early 18th centuries. They were based in the Matn area and historically opposed the Ma'n dynasty and Shihab dynasty. They were eliminated by the latter at the Battle of Ain Dara in 1711.

== History ==
The Sawwafs were based in the village of Chbaniyeh in the Matn area of Mount Lebanon, east of Beirut. They were the descendants of a certain Alam al-Din Sulayman al-Sawwaf ibn Husayn, who was killed in an engagement at Ayn Fujur in Wadi al-Taym in 1478, according to the local Druze chronicler Ibn Sibat (d. 1520). His son Abd al-Wahid and kinsman Zayn al-Din Salih died or were killed in 1503. A Sawwaf muqaddam (local chief) named Qaytbay was mentioned as the chief of the Matn area in an Ottoman document dated to 1558. He raided the home of the Bedouin chief Muhammad ibn al-Hanash in the southern Beqaa Valley in 1568. The following year he was granted the tax farm of the Matn subdistrict of Sidon-Beirut Sanjak. The Ottoman imperial government ordered the governor of Damascus Eyalet to confiscate his rifle stockpiles, along with those of Qurqumaz of the Ma'n dynasty, Mansur of the Assaf dynasty and Qasim of the Shihab dynasty.

During the early 17th century, the Sawwafs formed part of the Druze opposition, along with the Alam al-Dins and Arslans, to the powerful Druze chief, tax farmer and Ottoman governor Fakhr al-Din II. During the latter's exile in 1613–1618, they fought against his Ma'nid kinsmen and took refuge with Yusuf Sayfa in the Krak des Chevaliers after Fakhr al-Din's offensive against them in 1619. The apparent grandson of Qaytbay, Zayn al-Din, militarily supported Ali ibn Muhammad, the grandnephew of Yusuf Sayfa, in his victory against Yusuf's son Assaf in a battle at Iaal near Tripoli in 1634. He was appointed to governorship of Bsharri along with the Maronite chief Abu Awn al-Jumayyil (Abu Aoun Gemayel) in 1641. He and his nephew, the muqaddam Abdullah ibn Qaytbay, were given military charge over Wadi al-Taym alongside the Alam al-Din chiefs Mansur and Muhammad in 1659, following the expulsion of the Shihabs. Abdullah was killed near Beirut in a battle against the Qaysi Druze (the Sawwafs were part of the rival Yaman faction), which included the Ma'ns and Shihabs, in 1667. The traditional Druze rivals of the Sawwafs in the Matn were the Abu'l-Lama muqaddams of Kafr Silwan, allies of the Ma'ns and Shihabs. They fought in the ranks of the Yamani Druze against the Qays led by the Shihabs at the Battle of Ain Dara in 1711. The Yaman were routed, many of the Sawwafs were killed and family survivors fled the Matn and adopted different names.

== Bibliography ==
- Abu-Husayn, Abdul-Rahim (1985). Provincial Leaderships in Syria, 1575–1650. Beirut: American University of Beirut. ISBN 9780815660729.
- Hourani, Alexander (2010). New Documents on the History of Mount Lebanon and Arabistan in the 10th and 11th Centuries H. Beirut.
- Swayd, Sami (2015). Historical Dictionary of the Druzes (Second ed.). Lanham, Maryland: Rowman and Littlefield. ISBN 978-1-4422-4616-4.
