= Mulhim Ma'n =

Druze emir of Mount Lebanon

Sanjak-bey of Safed
- In office February 1657 – August 1657
- Monarch: Mehmed IV (r. 1648–1687)
- Preceded by: Unknown
- Succeeded by: Ahmed Agha Tatar

Zabit of Batroun
- In office 1650–Unknown
- Monarch: Mehmed IV
- Preceded by: Unknown
- Succeeded by: Unknown

Zabit of Akkar
- In office 1651–Unknown
- Monarch: Mehmed IV
- Preceded by: Unknown
- Succeeded by: Unknown

Personal details
- Born: Sidon-Beirut Sanjak, Ottoman Empire
- Died: 26 September 1658; Sidon, Ottoman Empire
- Relations: Ma'n dynasty; Fakhr al-Din II (paternal uncle); Hamdan (brother); Husayn Shihab (brother-in-law)
- Children: Qurqumaz; Ahmad; Fa'iza (daughter)
- Parent: Yunus ibn Qurqumaz Ma'n (father)
- Occupation: Multazim of the following nahiyas: Chouf, Gharb, Jurd and Matn (1641–1650; 1653–1658); Safed Sanjak (1657–1658)

Mulhim ibn Yunus Ma'n (Arabic: ملحم بن يونس معن) was the paramount Druze emir of Mount Lebanon and head of the Ma'n dynasty after succeeding his uncle Fakhr al-Din II in 1633. The Ottomans executed Fakhr al-Din, Mulhim's father Yunus, and his brothers and cousins during and after a massive expedition to end their control over large parts of the Levant. After Mulhim defeated his principal Druze rival, Ali Alam al-Din, in 1641, the Ottomans granted him tax farms (Note: Tax farming was the predominant mode of tax collection in Ottoman Syria where sanjaks (districts) and nahiyas (subdistricts) were farmed out by the government to local strongmen for limited terms in return for a fixed amount of money.) previously held by his uncle and father Yunus in southern Mount Lebanon, namely for the subdistricts of the Chouf, Gharb, Matn and Jurd. In 1657 he was appointed governor and tax farmer of Safed. He held onto the tax farms of southern Mount Lebanon until his death in 1658, after falling ill attempting to collect taxes in Safed.

Mulhim and his subordinates, including the Maronite Khazen family of Keserwan, reestablished the core of Fakhr al-Din's former territory. Like his uncle, he maintained good ties with the Maronite Church. He remained on good terms with the authorities throughout most of his career. The tax farms he held were largely inherited by his sons Qurqumaz and Ahmad, the latter retaining them until his death in 1697. Ahmad was the last Ma'nid emir and afterward the dynasty's tax farms and paramountcy over the Druze passed to their Sunni Muslim marital relatives, the Shihab dynasty.

== Family and political background ==
Mulhim belonged to the Ma'n dynasty, a family of Druze traditional emirs of the Chouf region of Mount Lebanon. His father Yunus was one of two sons of Qurqumaz, the Ma'nid chief of the Chouf who died in the 1585 Ottoman expedition against the Druze. The other son was Fakhr al-Din II, who succeeded Qurqumaz in his traditional role around 1591.

Fakhr al-Din gained the Ottomans' good graces and went on to become a powerful tax farmer and governor of the Sidon-Beirut and Safed sanjaks. Because of his increasing strength and autonomy, the Ottomans targeted Fakhr al-Din and the Ma'ns in an expedition in 1613, causing Fakhr al-Din to flee to Tuscany. Yunus largely took over his brother's role, but his power was initially confined to the Chouf. By 1616 Yunus and Fakhr al-Din's son Ali were installed as governors of Sidon-Beirut and Safed. Yunus resumed his role as the deputy of his brother upon Fakhr al-Din's return in 1618.

The Ma'ns expanded their control and tax farms to the Beqaa Valley and much of the Tripoli Eyalet, and their defiance of the Ottomans led to another punitive campaign in 1633. Ali was killed in the fighting, while Yunus was captured along with Mulhim and his brother Hamdan in the Jabal Amil area. Yunus and Hamdan were executed by the commander of the campaign, the Damascus governor Kuchuk Ahmed Pasha, but Mulhim escaped. Fakhr al-Din, meanwhile, was captured and imprisoned in Constantinople.

The Grand Duke of Tuscany Ferdinand II, a political ally and economic partner of Fakhr al-Din, dispatched a galleon to rescue Mulhim, but he was not found. He gained refuge with Ahmad Turabay, the chief of the Turabay dynasty, the Bedouin emirs and governors of the Lajjun Sanjak in northern Palestine. After becoming aware of the fates of Yunus and Fakhr al-Din, Ahmad had his kethuda (steward) escort Mulhim to Kuchuk Ahmed Pasha, but Mulhim escaped en route to Damascus. His residential property in a village called al-Jazira in the southern Beqaa Valley was confiscated and sold by Kuchuk Ahmed Pasha's order in 1634.

== Paramount Druze emir ==
While Fakhr al-Din was in prison, a rival Druze chief Ali Alam al-Din was appointed in his place over the tax farms of the Druze areas of Mount Lebanon, namely the Chouf, Gharb, Jurd and Matn districts. Mulhim led the Ma'nid opposition against Alam al-Din. He assaulted Alam al-Din and his forces at a place called Majdel Meouch, forcing their flight to Damascus. Alam al-Din returned with reinforcements and defeated Mulhim at Qabb Ilyas. The Ma'nid afterward went into hiding in the Chouf. His activities prompted the Ottomans to execute Fakhr al-Din in 1635, according to the 17th-century Maronite patriarch and historian Istifan al-Duwayhi.

In 1636 Mulhim and his following drove Alam al-Din out of the Chouf and, together with Assaf Sayfa of Tripoli, went after Alam al-Din and Assaf's nephew Ali as they made their way north. After besieging them in the village of al-Ghantu, they reached a truce and Mulhim returned to his Chouf redoubt. Generally after this victory, Mulhim and his allies among the Druze and Maronite chiefs, including the Khazens of Keserwan, were the stronger party in Mount Lebanon. This paramountcy was interrupted in 1638 when Alam al-Din was reinforced with Shia Muslim allies in Jabal Amil. Mulhim led an ambush against them in the village of Ansar where some 1,600 Shia Muslims were killed.

Mulhim had backing of the majority of the Druze of Mount Lebanon. This was indicated when the Druze inhabitants of the Chouf, Gharb, Matn and Jurd fled with him he fled before the combined forces of Alam al-Din and the deputy governor of Damascus in response to the Ansar ambush. Three years later he was appointed by imperial order the tax farmer of the Chouf, Gharb, Matn, Shahhar and Jurd for a one-year term. The imperial government concomitantly ordered that this muqataa be outside the fiscal authority of Damascus. The tax farm was renewed on an almost yearly basis until 1657.

== Consolidation in Mount Lebanon ==
In November 1650 he defeated Ibshir Mustafa Pasha, the governor of Damascus in an engagement in the Qarnana Valley. Another account held that Mulhim, with backing from the Ma'ns' longtime allies the Shihabs of Wadi al-Taym, defeated Damascene government forces hired by Alam al-Din in that clash.

That year, he was appointed the zabit (subdistrict governor) of Batroun in northern Mount Lebanon by the governor of Tripoli. He installed his confederate Abu Nawfal al-Khazen, a Maronite chief, to run the subdistrict on his behalf. Abu Nawfal had been patronized by Mulhim, like his father Abu Nadir had been by Fakhr al-Din. The Khazens collected the taxes in Keserwan, the area just north of the Druze country, fostered the Maronite majority there and invested considerable sums in silk farming, trade with Tuscany and France, and land. In 1651 Mulhim was also appointed zabit of Akkar, in the far north of Mount Lebanon.

== Governor and tax farmer of Safed ==
Four years later, to counter Alam al-Din's efforts to turn the imperial government against him, Mulhim sent his subordinate Mehmed Agha Qahveji Zade with a large bribe to Grand Vizier Murad Pasha. The Grand Vizier appointed Mehmed Agha as the sanjak-bey (district governor) of Safed, which comprised the Jabal Amil and the Galilee. Mulhim and his sons Qurqumaz and Ahmad subsequently relocated to Safed and in February 1657 he was directly appointed as governor of the sanjak. The appointment was to last one year, but in August he was dismissed and replaced with Ahmed Agha Tatar. The latter concurrently leased the tax farm of the sanjak to Mulhim.

While attempting to collect the taxes of Safed in August 1658 Mulhim became ill and left for Sidon. He died there on 26 September.

== Legacy ==
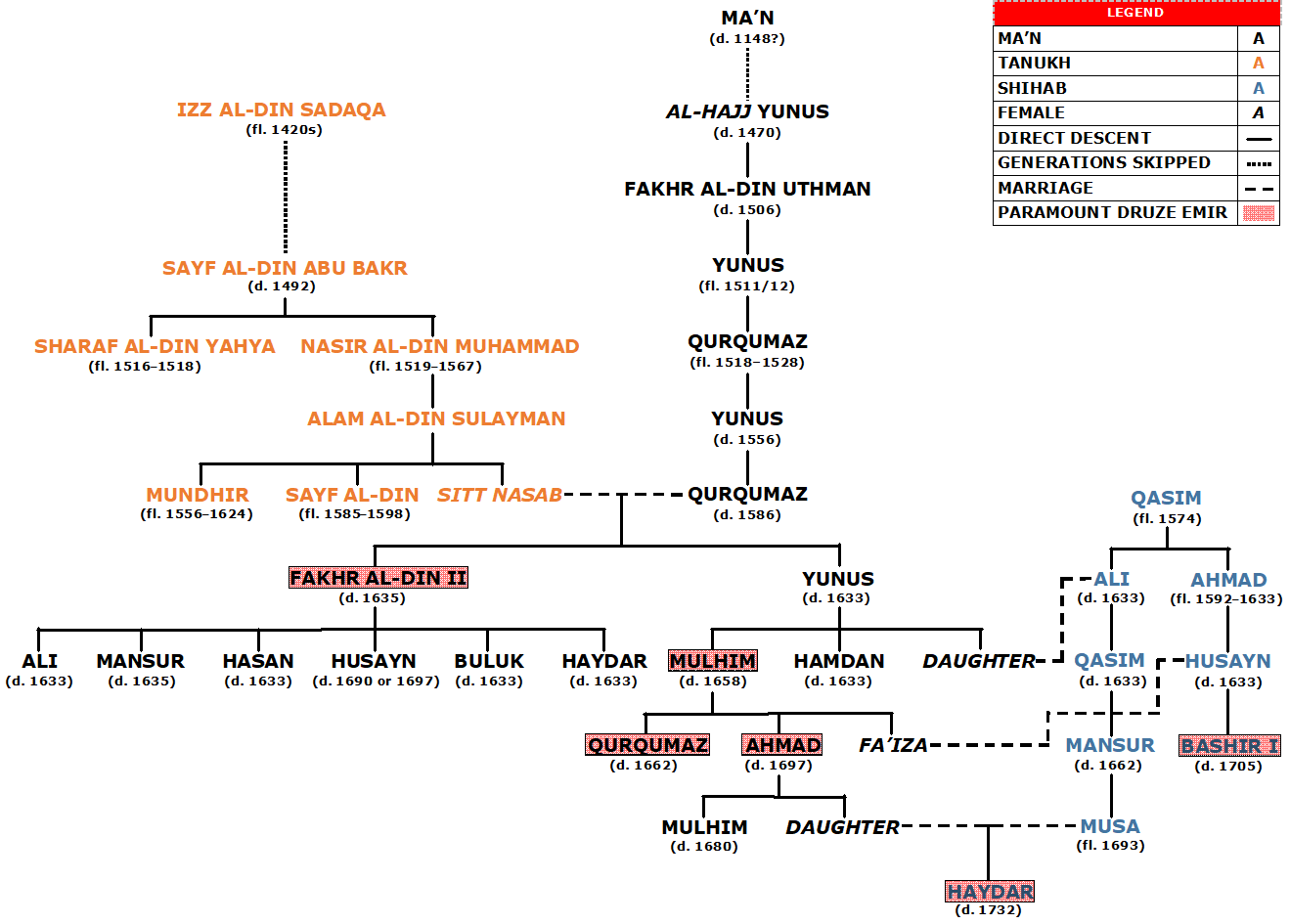
Genealogical tree of the Ma'n dynasty, indicating the paramount emirs of the Druze (shaded in red) and marital relations with the Shihab dynasty whose members succeeded the Ma'ns in their traditional emirate and tax farms

=== Children ===
Mulhim had two sons, Qurqumaz and Ahmad. His daughter Fa'iza was married to the traditional Druze emir of the Gharb, Salim ibn Yusuf (d. 1708) of the Arslan family, according to the Arslan family records. They had a son, Yusuf. According to the 19th-century local historian Tannus al-Shidyaq, a daughter of Mulhim (unclear if Fa'iza or another) was married to the emir Husayn, of the Sunni Muslim Shihab family in 1629. Ahmad's daughter was married to another Shihab emir, Musa, in 1674.

=== Assessment ===
Together with his Druze and Maronite confederates, including his uncle's former assistants, the Khazens, Mulhim reestablished Ma'nid control over the core area of Fakhr al-Din's former domain, namely the combined tax farms of the Chouf, Gharb, Jurd, Matn and Keserwan. Except for his confrontation with Mustafa Pasha in 1642, Mulhim "was fully obedient to the sultanate", according to the contemporary historian Muhammad al-Muhibbi, and did not rebel against Ottoman authority, a view shared by the modern historian Abdul-Rahim Abu-Husayn. Although there is no record of correspondence with his uncle's European partners, Mulhim's Maronite subordinates on a number of occasions communicated his honors to the Tuscans and the Pope. Correspondences between the Tuscans and Maronite clergymen and notables commended Mulhim for safeguarding the Maronite Church and its followers, a Ma'nid policy begun by Fakhr al-Din II.

Qurqumaz and Ahmad succeeded Mulhim in his tax farms in Mount Lebanon. In 1660 the Ottomans moved to strengthen imperial control over the sanjaks of Sidon-Beirut and Safed and its largely autonomous rural communities, especially the Druze. They combined the two sanjaks into a single eyalet (province), separate from Damascus, called the Sidon Eyalet. Shortly after, an imperial expedition, attended in person by the reformist Grand Vizier Koprulu Mehmed Pasha, was launched against the Ma'ns and their allies the Shihabs of Wadi al-Taym and the Shia Muslim Hamade lords of the Tripoli region. The Ma'ns' Druze rivals, the Alam al-Dins, the Sawwafs of the Matn, and Sirhal Imad gained control of southern Mount Lebanon, while Ahmad and Qurqumaz went into hiding in Hamade territory. Qurqumaz was killed by the Ottomans in 1662, while Ahmad went on to defeat his Druze rivals in 1667. Between then and his death in 1697 he held the tax farms and practical control of the Druze Mountain and Keserwan.

Ahmad's son Mulhim had died young in 1680 and so Ahmad left no male heir. His factional allies among the Druze resolved to elect Ahmad's maternal nephew Bashir Shihab I to serve as their chief and take over his tax farm. The transfer of the tax farms of southern Mount Lebanon were sanctioned by Sidon Eyalet's governor and the imperial government. Ahmad's grandson, the son of his daughter and Musa Shihab, Haydar Shihab, later succeeded Bashir.

=== Building works ===
Mulhim built the Khan al-Dabbagha caravanserai in the commercial center of Sidon's port at an undetermined date during his career. He is also credited by Laurent d'Arvieux, a 17th-century French diplomat and traveler, for building the city's Barrani Mosque. The mosque was built in the Ottoman style with a dome in the center, a portico topped with a dome and a "pencil-shaped minaret", according to the historian Stefan Weber.
