= Wadi al-Taym =

Valley in Lebanon

Coordinates: 33°26′N 35°42′E

Wadi al-Taym (Arabic: وادي التيم, romanized: Wādī al-Taym), also transliterated as Wadi el-Taym, is a wadi (dry river) that forms a large fertile valley in Lebanon, in the districts of Rachaya and Hasbaya on the western slopes of Mount Hermon. It adjoins the Beqaa Valley running north to south towards the Jordan Valley where it meets the northwest corner of Lake Huleh. Watered by the Hasbani river, the low hills of Wadi al-Taym are covered with rows of silver-green olive trees with the population in the area being predominantly Druze and Sunni, with a high number of Christians, mostly Greek Orthodox. Wadi al-Taym is generally considered the "birthplace of the Druze faith".

== History ==
Wadi al-Taym is named after the Arab tribe of Taym Allat (later Taym-Allah) ibn Tha'laba. The Taym-Allat entered the Euphrates Valley and adopted Christianity in the pre-Islamic period before ultimately embracing Islam after the 7th-century Muslim conquests. A small proportion of the tribe took up abode in the Wadi al-Taym at some point during the first centuries of Muslim rule. The Wadi al-Taym was the first area where the Druze appeared in the historical record under the name "Druze". According to many of the genealogical traditions of the Druze feudal families, the feudal Druze clans claimed descent from Arab tribes originally based in eastern Arabia and which entered Syria after periods of settlement in the Euphrates Valley. According to the historian Nejla Abu-Izzedin, "ethnically", the "Wadi al-Taym has been authoritatively stated to be one of the most Arab regions of [geographical] Syria". The area was one of the two most important centers of Druze missionary activity in the 11th century.

For much of the early 12th century, the Wadi al-Taym and the southern Chouf were the territory of the Jandal, a Druze clan. The leader of the clan, Dahhak ibn Jandal allied with the Crusaders of the Kingdom of Jerusalem and engaged in a feud with the Assassins who ruled the Banias fortress in the western foothills of Mount Hermon just south of Wadi al-Taym. Dahhak had killed Assassin leader Bahram al-Da'i in retaliation for the murder of his brother Baraq ibn Jandal. In 1133, he entered into conflict with Shams al-Mulk Isma'il, the Burid ruler of Damascus, who subsequently expelled Dahhak from his holdout in the fortified Tyron Cave east of Sidon. In 1149, Dahhak was himself murdered by Assassins, revenge for the slaying of the da'i. The Wadi al-Taym was taken over by the Shihabs, a Sunni Muslim clan in the army of the Ayyubid sultan Saladin, in 1173. The Shihab formed an alliance with the Druze Ma'n family of southern Mount Lebanon. Unlike other immigrants to the Wadi al-Taym, the Shihabs did not embrace the Druze faith, which was the dominant religion of the areas between the Gharb district of southern Mount Lebanon southward to the Wadi al-Taym. In 1287, the Shihab emir Sa'ad ibn Qurqmaz, now allied with the Mamluk successors of the Ayyubids, confronted a Mongol incursion into the Wadi al-Taym.

== Bibliography ==
- Abu Izzedin, Nejla M. (1993) [1984]. The Druzes: A New Study of Their History, Faith, and Society (2nd ed.). Leiden and New York: Brill. ISBN 90-04-09705-8.
- Hitti, Philip K. (1966). The Origins of the Druze People: With Extracts from Their Sacred Writings. AMS Press.
- Harris, William (2012). Lebanon: A History, 600–2011. Oxford: Oxford University Press. ISBN 978-0-19-518112-8.
