= Aghmeed =

Village about 37km from Beirut, in the governorate of Mount Lebanon

Coordinates: 33.7833°N 35.5333°E

Aghmeed أغميد
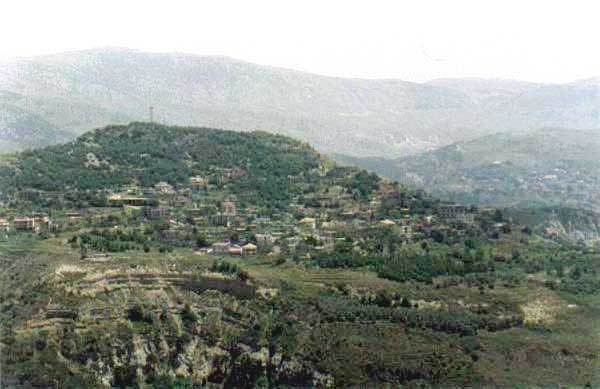
- Interactive map of Aghmeed
- Country: Lebanon
- Governorate: Mount Lebanon Governorate
- District: Aley District
- Elevation: 3,900 ft (1,200 m)
- Time zone: UTC+2 (EET)
  - Summer (DST): +3
- Website: www.aghmeed.com

Aghmeed, also spelled Aghmide (Arabic: أغميد, romanized: ʾAghmīd), is a village located about 37 km from Beirut, in the governorate of Mount Lebanon, in the Aley District. One can reach Aghmeed through Mdairej Road, Ain Dara and Al Azzounieh. Aghmeed is at an altitude of 1,200 m, close to Mount Barouk, which is famous for its cedar forest.

Other villages surrounding Aghmeed are : Al Azzounieh, Ain Dara, Sharoun, Bmahray, Alramlieh, Al Mreijat, Nabaa Al Safa and Ain Zhalta.
