= History of Lebanon under Ottoman rule =

1516–1918 period of Lebanese history

The Ottoman Empire nominally ruled Mount Lebanon from its conquest in 1516 until the end of World War I in 1918.

The Ottoman sultan, Selim I (1516–20), invaded Syria and Lebanon in 1516. The Ottomans, through the Maans, a great Druze feudal family, and the Shihabs, a Sunni Muslim family that had converted to Christianity, ruled Lebanon until the middle of the nineteenth century.

Ottoman administration, however, was only effective in urban areas, while most of the country was ruled by tribal chieftains, based largely on their ability to collect taxes for the sultan. The system of administration in Lebanon during this period is best described by the Arabic word iqta', which refers to a political system, similar to other feudal societies, composed of autonomous feudal families that were subservient to the emir, who himself was nominally loyal to the sultan; therefore, allegiance depended heavily upon personal loyalty. The Ottoman Empire also provided minority religious communities autonomy through the millet system to the extent that they could regulate themselves, while recognizing the supremacy of the Ottoman administration.

It was precisely this power structure, made up of fiefdoms, that allowed Bashir II, an emir from the Shihab dynasty in the Druze and Maronite districts of Mount Lebanon, to gain lordship over Mount Lebanon in Ottoman Syria during the first part of the 19th century. It was during this period that Bashir II became an ally of Muhammad Ali who tried to secure Egyptian rule in Mount Lebanon. This was also a period that saw increasing class and sectarian antagonisms that would define Lebanese social and political life for decades to come. The partition of Mount Lebanon into Maronite and Druze provinces raised animosities between the different sects, backed by European powers. This ultimately culminated in the 1860 massacre. After these events, an international commission of France, Britain, Austria, and Prussia intervened. The Ottoman Empire implemented administrative and judicial changes.

== Ottoman rule 1516–1918 ==
The Ottoman Empire was marked by diversity in which communities lived parallel lives. Religious affiliation proved to be a cornerstone in the way the Ottoman state designated and discriminated between its people. The superiority of Islam played a central role in imperial ideology, but this was not a central tenet of what it meant to be "Ottoman". Instead, a central tenet of subjects was to subordinate to the House of Osman. The important aspect of chieftains was their ability to collect taxes for the Empire. This administration is also referred to as iqta', meaning that autonomous feudal families served the emir, who in turn served the sultan in Istanbul. Personal loyalty played an important role in this allegiance. The House of Osman regarded the absolute sovereignty of the Ottoman ruler as crucial to maintain an Empire that included many different communities. These communities included, among others, Ashkenazi, Lebanese, Maronites, Copts, Armenians, and Jews. These communities had to obey the Ottoman fiscal system; in return they received religious and civil autonomy. However, in society it was evident that Islamic law and control were dominant. Christians and Jews were considered dhimmis, meaning they were perceived as inferior, but also non-Muslim and safeguarded. They were referred to as the "people of the book." Although discrimination was pervasive in the Empire, non-Muslim communities went to court for legal issues and were subsequently motivated to establish themselves as self-determining communities. This millet legal system was an integral part of the Empire and sustained Ottoman imperial rule over diverse peoples through legal protection of autonomous confessional communities. Until the nineteenth century, different communities were not explicitly tied to political belonging.

== Ottoman conquest ==
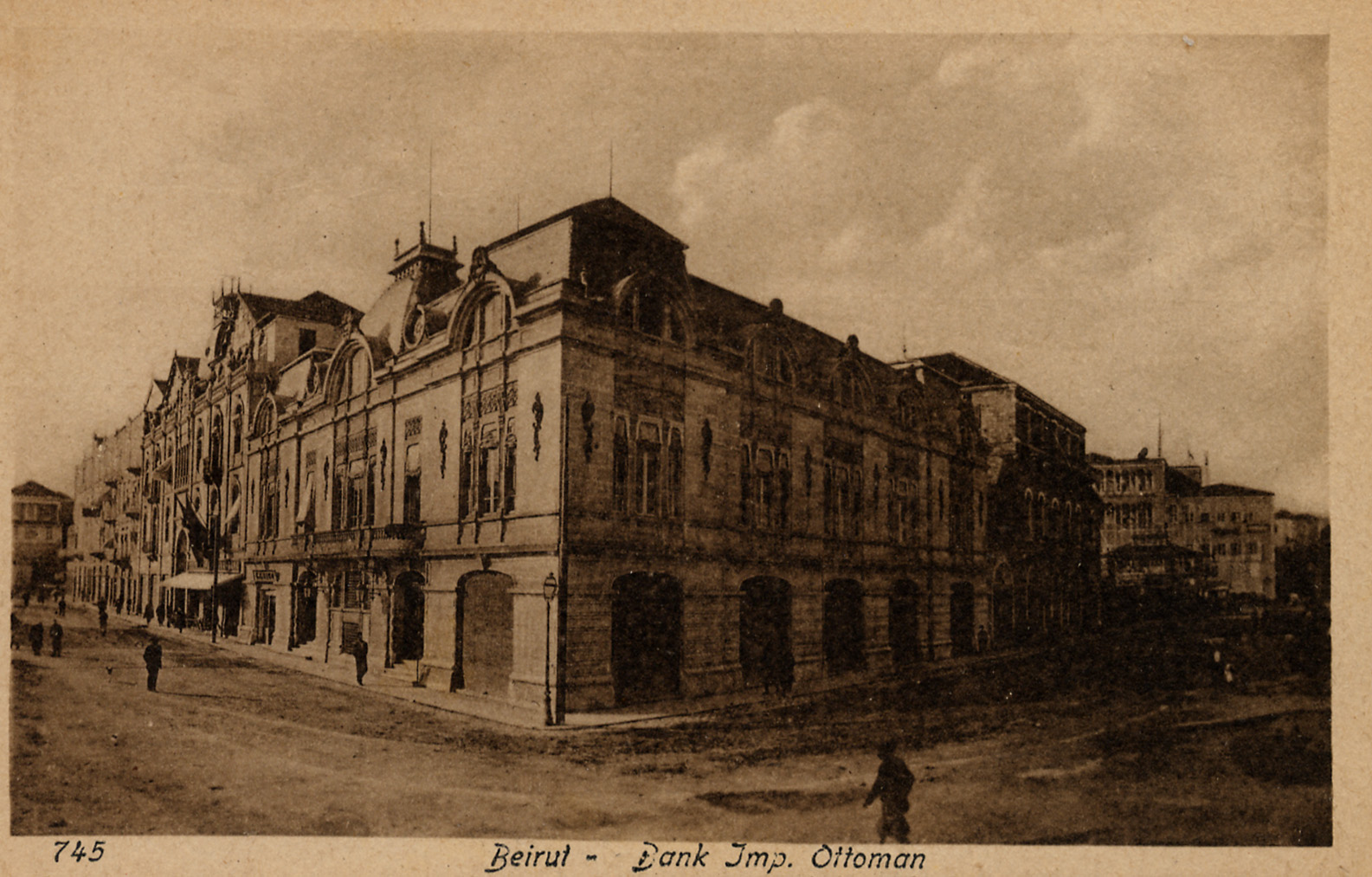
Ottoman Bank in Beirut.

The Ottoman sultan, Selim I (1512–20), after defeating the Safavids, conquered the Mamluks of Egypt. His troops, invading Syria, destroyed Mamluk resistance in 1516 at the Battle of Marj Dabiq, north of Aleppo.

== Maan family rule ==
Following the Ottoman conquest, the Chouf was administratively divided into three nahiyas (subdistricts) of the Sidon-Beirut Sanjak, which was a district of the Damascus Eyalet. The Chouf subdistricts, along with the subdistricts of Gharb, Jurd and Matn were predominantly populated by Druze at the time and collectively referred to as the Druze Mountain. The Ottoman sultan Selim I, after entering Damascus and receiving the defection of its Mamluk governor Janbirdi al-Ghazali, who was kept in his post, showed preference to the Turkmen Assaf clan, the Keserwan-based enemies of the Ma'nids' Buhturid allies. He entrusted the Assafs with political authority or tax-farming rights in the subdistricts between Beirut and Tripoli, north of the Druze Mountain. The Buhturid emir Jamal al-Din Hajji did not give allegiance to Selim in Damascus and after discarding an Ottoman call to arms in 1518, he was imprisoned. The son of the Ma'nid emir Yunus, Qurqumaz, was summoned and confirmed by Selim in Damascus as the chief of the Chouf in 1517, according to the 17th-century historian and Maronite patriarch Istifan al-Duwayhi. Ibn Sibat does not mention any Ma'nid being received by the sultan in Damascus, but noted that the Ma'nid emirs Qurqumaz, Alam al-Din Sulayman and Zayn al-Din were all arrested by Janbirdi al-Ghazali in 1518 and transferred to the custody of Selim, who released them after a heavy fine for supporting the rebellion of the Bedouin Banu al-Hansh emirs in Sidon and the Beqaa Valley.

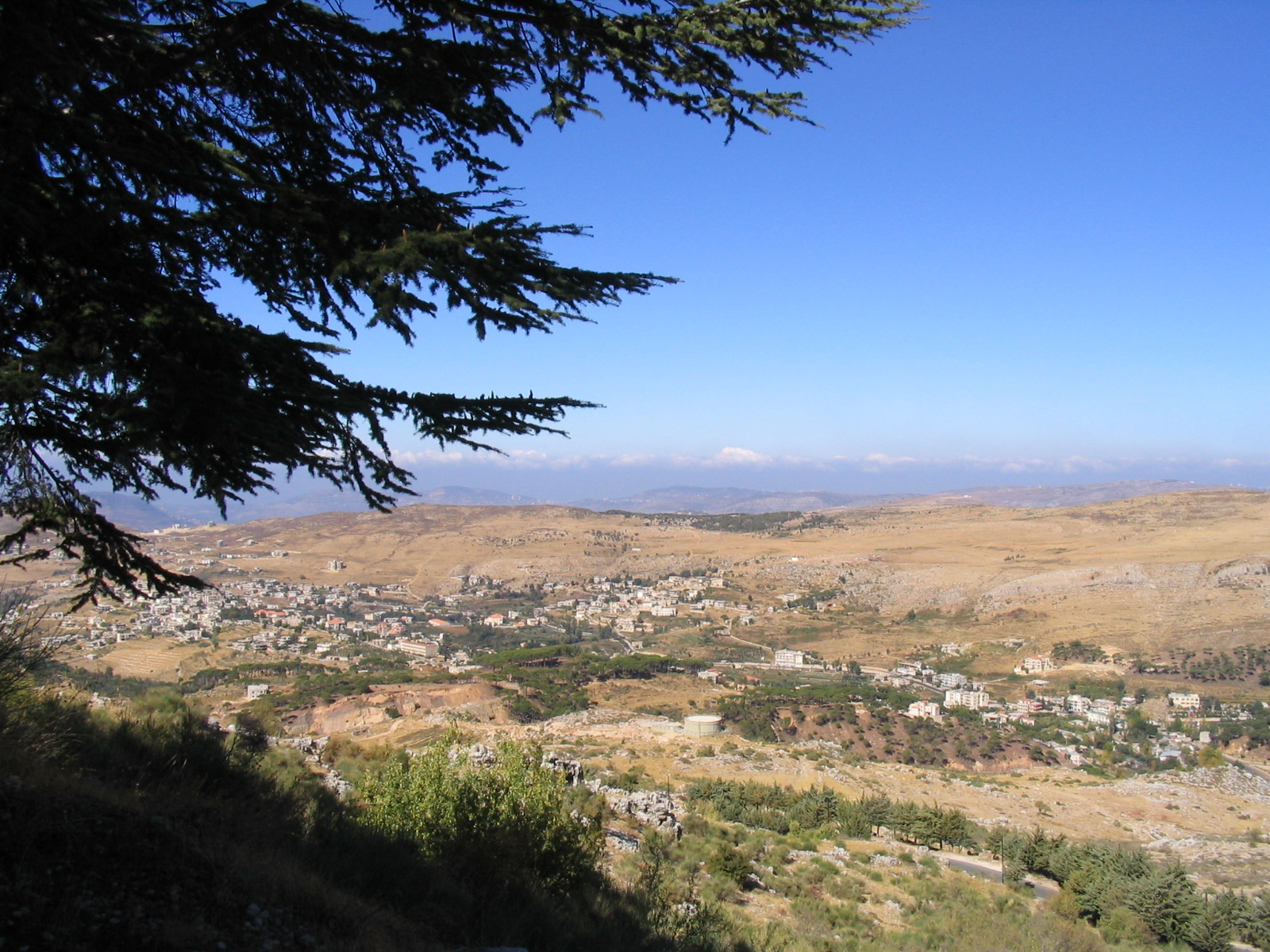
The village of Baruk (pictured in 2005) was the headquarters of Qurqumaz, the grandson of Fakhr al-Din I and ancestor of Fakhr al-Din II

The three Ma'nids likely shared the chieftainship of the Chouf, though the length and nature of the arrangement is not known. Zayn al-Din is assumed by the modern historian Abdul-Rahim Abu-Husayn to be the "Zayn Ibn Ma'n" mentioned in an Ottoman register as the owner of a dilapidated watermill with two millstones in 1543, while Ibn Tulun's reference to a part of the Chouf as "Shuf Sulayman Ibn Ma'n" in 1523 likely refers to Alam al-Din Sulayman. Neither Zayn nor Sulayman are mentioned by later chroniclers of the Ma'nids, likely for political reasons related to the chroniclers' association to the Ma'nid line of Qurqumaz. The latter was based in the Chouf village of Baruk, where he gave refuge to members of the Sayfa family after their flight from Akkar in 1528. Qurqumaz's establishment in Baruk instead of his predecessors' apparent seat in Deir al-Qamar may have been related to a conflict with Alam al-Din Sulayman, who may have controlled Deir al-Qamar at the time, or a division of the Chouf between the Ma'nid chieftains.

In 1523 forty-three villages in Shuf Sulayman Ibn Ma'n, including Baruk, were burned by the forces of the Damascus governor Khurram Pasha for tax arrears and Ma'nid disobedience, and the governor's forces sent back to Damascus four cartloads of Druze heads and religious texts in the aftermath of the campaign. According to Harris, "such brutality entrenched [Druze] resistance", and in the following year Druze fighters killed subashis (provincial officials) appointed by Khurram Pasha to administer Mount Lebanon's subdistricts, prompting another government expedition against the Chouf, which returned three cartloads of Druze heads and three hundred women and children as captives. The death of Jamal al-Din Hajji in prison in 1521 and the Ottoman expeditions led the Buhturids to accept Ma'nid precedence over the Druze of southern Mount Lebanon. In 1545 the leading emir of the Druze, Yunus Ma'n, was lured to Damascus and executed by the authorities under unclear circumstances, but suggesting continued insubordination by the Druze under Ma'nid leadership.

Following the death of Yunus, the Druze moved to import from the Venetians long-range muskets superior to those employed by the Ottomans. In 1565 the new arms were put to use by the Druze in an ambush on Ottoman sipahi (fief-holding cavalries) in Ain Dara in the Jurd sent to collect taxes from southern Mount Lebanon. For the next twenty years, the Druze successfully beat back government attempts to collect taxes and confiscate weapons, while increasing their rifle arsenals. In 1585 the imperial authorities organized a much larger campaign against the Chouf and the Sidon-Beirut Sanjak in general led by the beylerbey (provincial governor) of Egypt, Ibrahim Pasha. It ended in a decisive government victory, the confiscation of thousands of rifles and the collection of tax arrears, which had been accruing for decades, in the form of currency or property. The most important leader in the Chouf at the time was a Ma'nid emir named Qurqumaz, possibly the son of Yunus, The modern historian Muhammad Adnan Bakhit holds this Yunus was likely the head of the Ma'nids at the time. A Ma'nid chief named Yunus was recorded by the contemporary poet Muhammad ibn Mami al-Rumi (d. 1579) to have been captured and hanged by the Ottomans at an undefined date as a result of unspecified complaints by the qadi (head judge) of Sidon to the Sublime Porte. and possibly the grandson of the above-mentioned Qurqumaz. He had likely been the chieftain of the specific area of the Chouf referred to as "Shuf Ibn Ma'n", a subdistrict mentioned in Ottoman government documents from 1523, 1530, 1543 and 1576. His preeminence among the Ma'nids was possibly the result of the natural deaths or eliminations of the other Ma'nid chiefs. Like his father, Qurqumaz was a multazim (tax farmer) in the Chouf, though he resided in Ain Dara, and was recognized as a muqaddam of the Druze, his title of "emir" being used by local historians as a traditional honor rather than an official rank. Qurqumaz had refused to submit to Ibrahim Pasha and escaped the Chouf and died soon after in hiding.{{efn|According to the Maronite patriarch and historian Istifan al-Duwayhi (d. 1704), Qurqumaz was killed during a government expedition against the Chouf in 1585, precipitated by Qurqumaz's alleged orchestration of an attack the preceding year on a government convoy in Akkar that had been transporting the annual Egyptian tribute destined for the sultan in Constantinople The aftermath of the campaign and the death of Qurqumaz left the Druze Mountain in an anarchic state marked by internal fighting among the Druze.

=== Era of Fakhr al-Din II ===
==== Control of Sidon-Beirut and Safed sanjaks ====
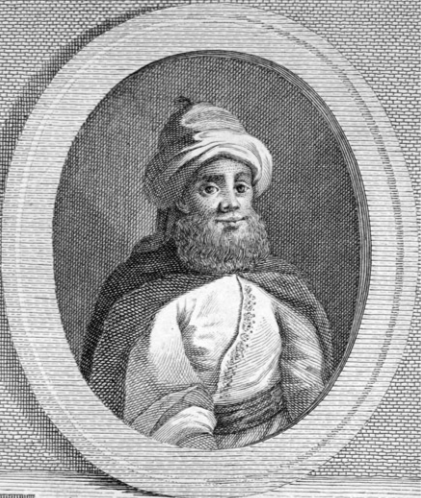
Engraving of a portrait of Fakhr al-Din II.

Around 1590 Qurqumaz was succeeded by his eldest son Fakhr al-Din II as the muqaddam of all or part of the Chouf. Unlike his Ma'nid predecessors, Fakhr al-Din cooperated with the Ottomans, who, though able to suppress Mount Lebanon's local chiefs with massive force, were unable to pacify the region in the long term without local support. When the veteran general Murad Pasha was appointed beylerbey of Damascus, Fakhr al-Din hosted and gave him expensive gifts upon his arrival to Sidon in September 1593. Murad Pasha reciprocated by appointing him the sanjak-bey (district governor, called amir liwa in Arabic sources) of Sidon-Beirut in December. The Ottomans' preoccupation with the wars against Safavid Iran (1578–1590; 1603–1618) and the war with Hapsburg Austria afforded Fakhr al-Din the space to consolidate and expand his semi-autonomous power.

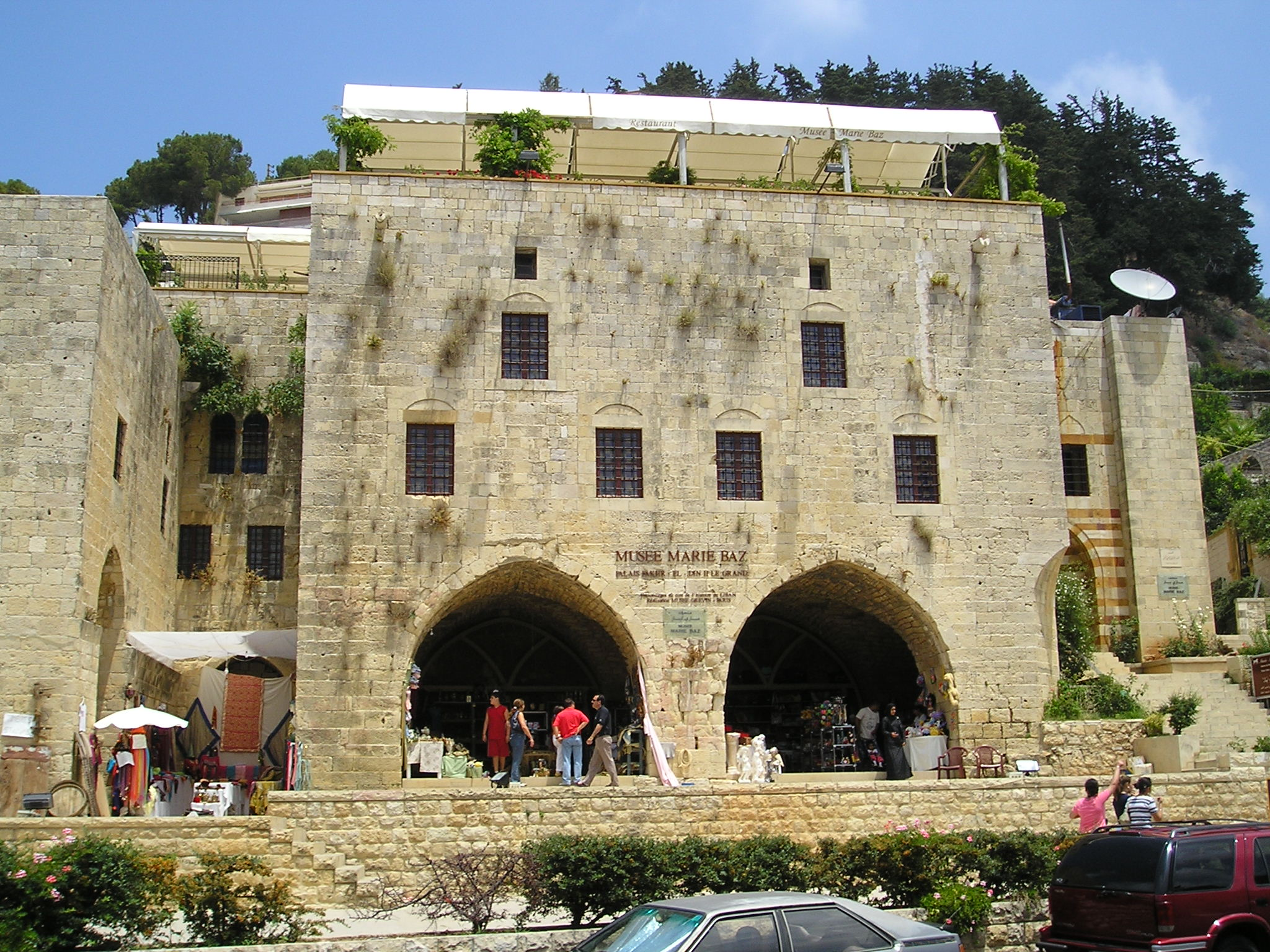
The saray in Deir al-Qamar, seat of the Ma'n under Fakhr al-Din

In July 1602, after his political patron Murad Pasha became a vizier in Constantinople, Fakhr al-Din was appointed the sanjak-bey of Safed. With the Druze of Sidon-Beirut and Safed under his authority, he effectively became their paramount chief. Fakhr al-Din may have been appointed to the post to leverage his Druze power base against the Shia.

In 1606 Fakhr al-Din made common cause with the Kurdish rebel Ali Janbulad of Aleppo against his local rival Yusuf Sayfa of Tripoli; the latter had been invested as commander-in-chief of the Ottoman armies in the Levant to suppress Janbulad. Fakhr al-Din may have been motivated by his ambitions of regional autonomy, defense of his territory from Sayfa, or expanding his control to Beirut and Keserwan, both held by Sayfa. The rebel allies besieged Sayfa in Damascus, eventually forcing his flight. In the course of the fighting, Fakhr al-Din took over the Keserwan. When Janbulad was defeated by the Ottomans, Fakhr al-Din appeased Murad Pasha, who had since become grand vizier, with substantial sums of cash and goods. The high amount is an indicator of the Ma'ns' wealth. Fakhr al-Din was kept as sanjak-bey of Safed, his son Ali was appointed as sanjak-bey of Sidon-Beirut and the Ma'ns' control of Keserwan was recognized by the Porte.

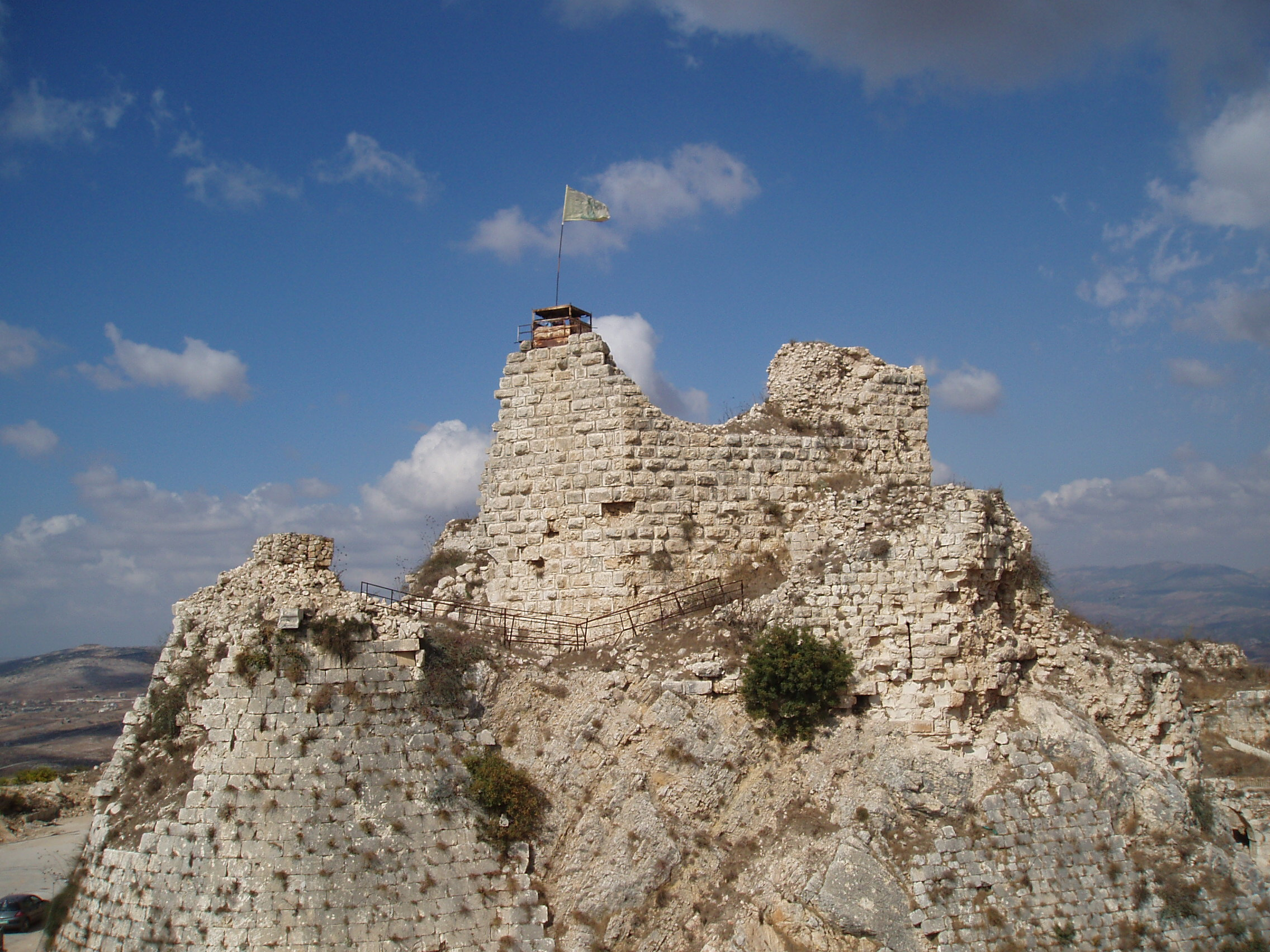
Shaqif Arnun was a stronghold of Fakhr al-Din, guarding his domains from the south.

==== Interregnum of Yunus and Ali ====
Fakhr al-Din lost imperial favor with the death of Murad Pasha in July 1611 and the succession of Nasuh Pasha. By then the Porte, freed up from the wars with Austria and Iran and the Jelali revolts in Anatolia, had turned its attention to affairs in the Levant. The authorities had become wary of Fakhr al-Din's expanding territory, his alliance with Grand Duchy of Tuscany, his unsanctioned strengthening and garrisoning of fortresses and his employment of outlawed sekbans. Nasuh Pasha appointed Ahmed Pasha, the governor of Damascus, at the head of a large army to suppress Fakhr al-Din. The latter boarded a European ship and escaped to Livorno, Tuscany.

In Fakhr al-Din's absence his younger brother Yunus acted as head of the family in the Chouf. The Ma'ns' sekbans stationed in their headquarter village of Deir al-Qamar collaborated with Ahmed Pasha, prompting Yunus to abandon the village for Baakline. Ali Ma'n, meanwhile, was deserted by his bodyguard of sekbans in Mafraq in the Syrian Desert where he evaded Ahmed Pasha. The Ma'nid fortresses of Shaqif Arnun and Subayba, which the Ottomans sought to dismantle, were controlled by the family's sekbans led by Husayn Yaziji and Husayn Tawil, respectively; with the help of the rival Harfush dynasty of Baalbek, the sekban commanders arranged the two fortresses' demolition and were rewarded by the authorities. The Ma'ns were stripped of their governorships of Sidon-Beirut, Safed, and Keserwan, but Yunus retained the tax farm of the Chouf from the governor of the newly created Sidon Eyalet in 1614. Their Druze and Shia rivals re-emerged as the tax farmers and governors of their home districts in Mount Lebanon and Jabal Amil.

Although the Ma'ns' position was severely weakened, in 1615 political circumstances changed in their favor with Nasuh Pasha being executed, Ahmed Pasha being replaced by a friendly governor, the Sidon Eyalet being dissolved, and troops being withdrawn from Syria to fight on the Iranian front. Yunus and Ali were appointed to Safed and Sidon-Beirut, respectively, and shortly after both governorships were given to Ali. The Ma'ns then confronted their Druze rivals, namely Muzaffar al-Andari of the Jurd, the Arslan chief Muhammad ibn Jamal al-Din of Choueifat in the Gharb, and the Sawwafs of Chbaniyeh in the Matn. Ali and Yunus defeated them in four engagements in the Druze Mountain, at Ighmid, Ain Dara, Abeih and the spring of Naimeh on the coast south of Beirut. In the course of the fighting, they retook control of Beirut and the Keserwan. Afterward Ali awarded the Ma'ns' Tanukhid allies and relatives the tax farms of Beirut, the Gharb and the Jurd, and the Abu'l-Lama family the tax farm of the Matn.

Growing opposition to the Ma'ns by the Shias of Safed Sanjak culminated with their backing of Yaziji's efforts to replace Ali as sanjak-bey there and their alliance with the Harfushes in 1617–1618. Yaziji was killed almost immediately after taking up office in Safed in June 1618, and Ali was restored to the post. Meanwhile, tensions rose between the Ma'ns and their Tanukhid and Abu'l-Lama allies relating to property disputes in Beirut.

==== Peak of power ====
The Ottomans pardoned Fakhr al-Din and he returned to Mount Lebanon, arriving in Acre on 29 September 1618. Upon hearing of his return, the Ma'ns' Druze allies immediately reconciled with Ali and from that point there was no further active Druze opposition to Fakhr al-Din. Uneasy about the growing ties between the Harfushes and the Shia chiefs of Safed, he arrested the preeminent chief of the Shia in Jabal Amil, Ali Munkir, and released him after a ransom paid by Yunus al-Harfush. He moved to supervise the collection of taxes in Bilad Bishara in December, prompting the Shia notable families of Ali Saghir, Munkir, Shukr and Daghir to take refuge with Yunus al-Harfush and evade payment. Fakhr al-Din responded by destroying their homes. He then reconciled with the Jabal Amil chiefs and Shia levies thereafter joined his army in his later military campaigns.

Fakhr al-Din moved against the Sayfas in 1619, capturing and looted their stronghold of Hisn Akkar and four days later besieging Yusuf and the latter's Druze allies in the Krak des Chevaliers. He then sent a detachment to burn the Sayfas' home village of Akkar and gained the defection of the Sayfa forts of Byblos and Smar Jbeil. Fakhr al-Din was compelled by Ottoman pressure to lift the siege, but during the hostilities had gained control of the Byblos and Batroun nahiyas. Yusuf was dismissed in 1622 after failing to remit taxes to the Porte, but refused to hand over power to his replacement Umar Kittanji, who in turn requested Fakhr al-Din's military support. Fakhr al-Din complied in return for the iltizam of the Tripoli nahiyas of Dinniyeh, Bsharri and Akkar. Once Fakhr al-Din set out from Ghazir, Yusuf abandoned Tripoli for Akkar. The Emir thereafter sent his Maronite ally Abu Safi Khazen, the brother of his mudabbir (fiscal and political adviser, scribe) Abu Nadir Khazen, to occupy Maronite-populated Bsharri, thereby ending the rule of the local Maronite muqaddams established since the late 14th century. In 1623 Fakhr al-Din mobilized his forces in Bsharri in support of Yusuf's rebellious nephew Sulayman, who controlled Safita. Fakhr al-Din's intervention confirmed the Ma'ns as the practical overlords of Safita.

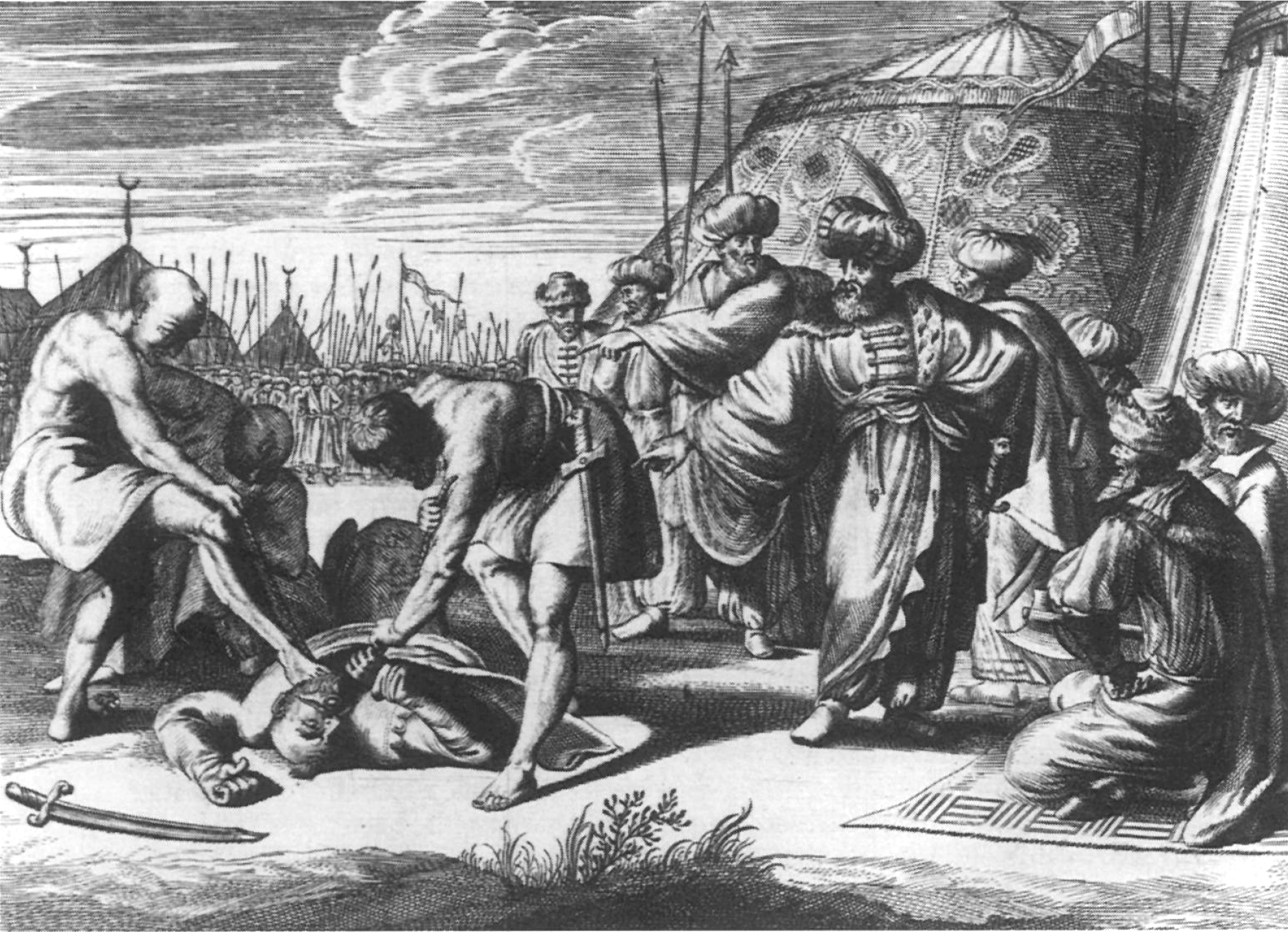
An engraving by Olfert Dapper from 1677 depicting Fakhr al-Din's capture of Mustafa Pasha, beylerbey of Damascus, at the Battle of Anjar in 1623. Fakhr al-Din is shown as the standing, turbaned figure pointing toward Mustafa Pasha, who is being held to the ground.

In August/September 1623 Fakhr al-Din evicted the Harfushes from the southern Beqaa village of Qabb Ilyas for their prohibition on the Chouf Druze from cultivating their fields there. Meanwhile, in June/July the Porte had replaced Ali Ma'n as sanjak-bey of Safed with a certain Bustanji Bashi and replaced his brother Husayn and the Ma'n loyalist Mustafa Kethuda as the sanjak-beys of Ajlun and Nablus with local opponents of the Ma'ns. The Porte soon after restored the Ma'ns to Ajlun and Nablus, but not to Safed. The Ma'ns thereupon moved to assume control of Ajlun and Nablus. Fakhr al-Din launched a campaign against the Turabays and Farrukhs in northern Palestine, but was defeated in a battle at the Awja River near Ramla. On his way back to Mount Lebanon from the abortive Palestine campaign, Fakhr al-Din was notified that the Porte reappointed his sons and allies to Safed, Ajlun and Nablus. The governor of Damascus, Mustafa Pasha, backed by the Harfushes and Sayfas, nonetheless proceeded to launch an expedition against the Ma'ns. Fakhr al-Din routed the Damascene force at Anjar and captured Mustafa Pasha. Fakhr al-Din extracted from the beylerbey confirmation of the Ma'ns' gpvernorships and the additional appointments of himself over Gaza Sanjak, his son Mansur over Lajjun Sanjak, and Ali over the southern Beqaa nahiya. The appointments to Gaza, Nablus and Lajjun were not implemented due to the opposition of local powerholders. Fakhr al-Din plundered Baalbek soon after Anjar and captured and destroyed its citadel on 28 March. Yunus al-Harfush was executed in 1625, the same year that Fakhr al-Din gained the governorship of the Baalbek nahiya.

By 1624 Fakhr al-Din and his allies among the Sayfas who defected from Yusuf was in control of most of the Tripoli Eyalet, except for Tripoli city, the Krak des Chevaliers, the Koura nahiya, and the Jableh sanjak. A few months after Yusuf's death in July 1625, Fakhr al-Din launched an assault against Tripoli. He forced out his old ally Sulayman Sayfa from the Safita fortress and was later ceded the fortresses of Krak des Chevaliers and Marqab by Yusuf's sons. In September 1626 he captured the fortress of Salamiyah, followed by Hama and Homs, appointing his deputies to govern them. Fakhr al-Din was appointed beylerbey of Tripoli in 1627, according solely to Duwayhi. By the early 1630s Fakhr al-Din captured many places around Damascus, controlled thirty fortresses, commanded a large army of sekbans, and, according to a contemporary Ottoman historian, the "only thing left for him to do was to claim the Sultanate".

==== Demise ====
The imperial government appointed Kuchuk Ahmed Pasha as governor of Damascus and fitted him with a large army to destroy Ma'nid power. Kuchuk first defeated and killed Ali near Khan Hasbaya in Wadi al-Taym. Fakhr al-Din and his men subsequently took refuge in a cave in Niha in the southern Chouf or further south in Jezzine. To smoke them out of their hiding places, Kuckuk started fires around the mountains. Fakhr al-Din consequently surrendered. His sons Mansur and Husayn, the latter of whom was stationed in Marqab, had already been captured by Kuchuk. His sons Hasan, Haydar, and Bulak, his brother Yunus and nephew Hamdan ibn Yunus were all executed by Kuckuk during the expedition. Fakhr al-Din was imprisoned in Constantinople and he and his son Mansur were executed in 1635 on the orders of Murad IV.

=== Later emirs ===
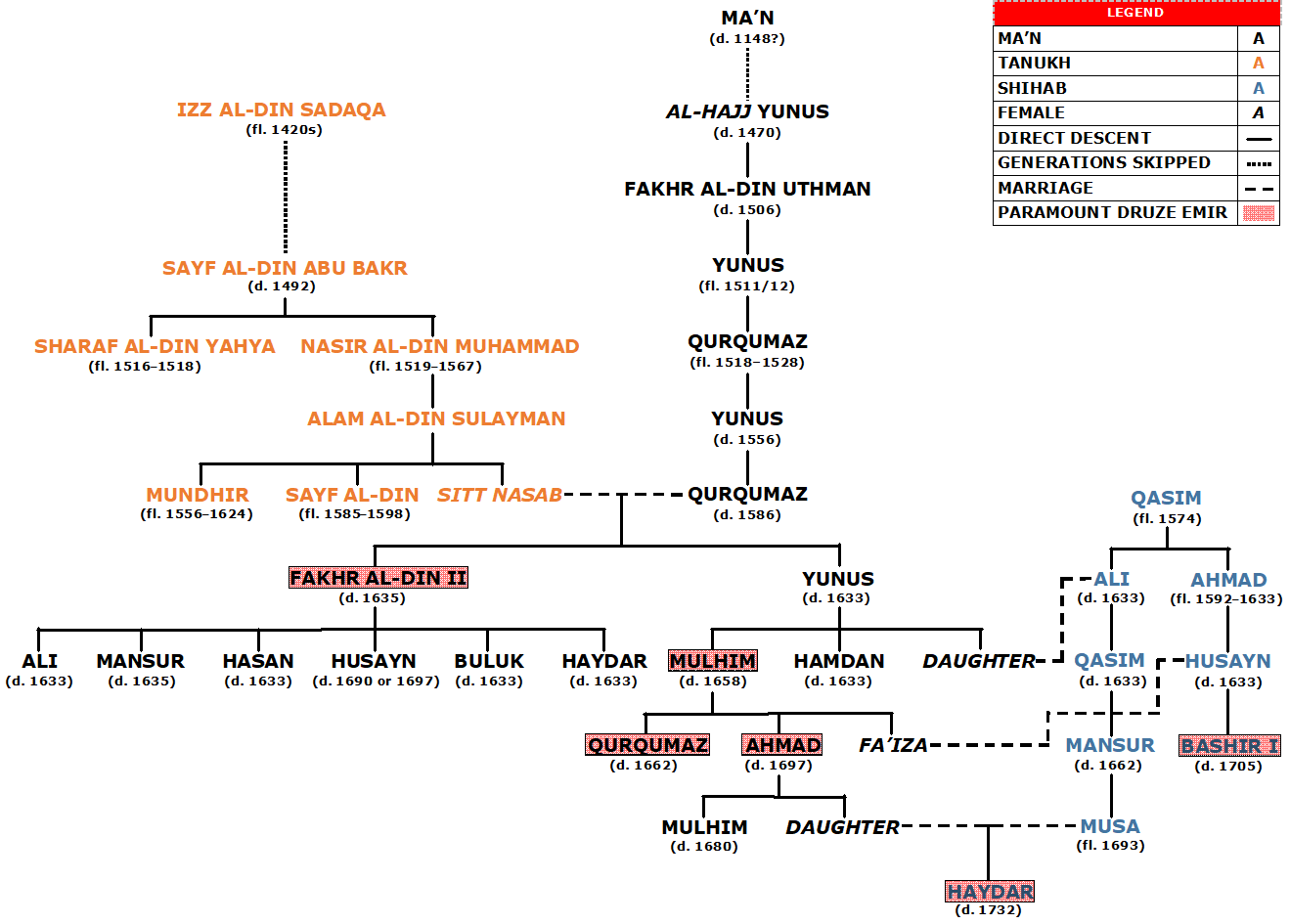
Genealogical tree of the Ma'n dynasty

The Druze enemy of the Ma'ns, Ali Alam al-Din, was given authority over the Chouf by the Ottomans. A surviving member of the dynasty, Mulhim Ma'n, the son of Yunus and nephew of Fakhr al-Din, had evaded capture and led the Druze opposition to Alam al-Din, defeating him in a battle and forcing his flight to Damascus in 1635. Alam al-Din soon after defeated Mulhim in the Beqaa Valley, but Mulhim finally drove him out of the Chouf in 1636. The people of the Druze Mountain mostly backed him. In 1642 he was appointed by the Ottomans the multazim of the Chouf, Jurd, Gharb, and Matn, a position he largely held until 1657.

Following Mulhim's death, his sons Ahmad and Qurqumaz entered into a power struggle with Ottoman-backed Druze leaders. In 1660, the Ottoman Empire moved to reorganize the region, placing the sanjaks (districts) of Sidon-Beirut and Safed in a newly formed province of Sidon, a move seen by local Druze as an attempt to assert control. Contemporary historian Istifan al-Duwayhi reports that Korkmaz was killed in act of treachery by the Beylerbey of Damascus in 1662. Ahmad however escaped and eventually emerged victorious in the power struggle among the Druze in 1667, but the Maʿnīs lost control of Safad and retreated to controlling the iltizam of the Shuf mountains and Kisrawan. Ahmad continued as local ruler through his death from natural causes, without heir, in 1697. During the Ottoman–Habsburg War (1683–1699), Ahmad Ma'n collaborated in a rebellion against the Ottomans which extended beyond his death. Iltizam rights in Chouf and Kisrawan passed to the rising Shihab family through female-line inheritance.

== Shihab dynasty ==
=== Regency of Bashir I ===
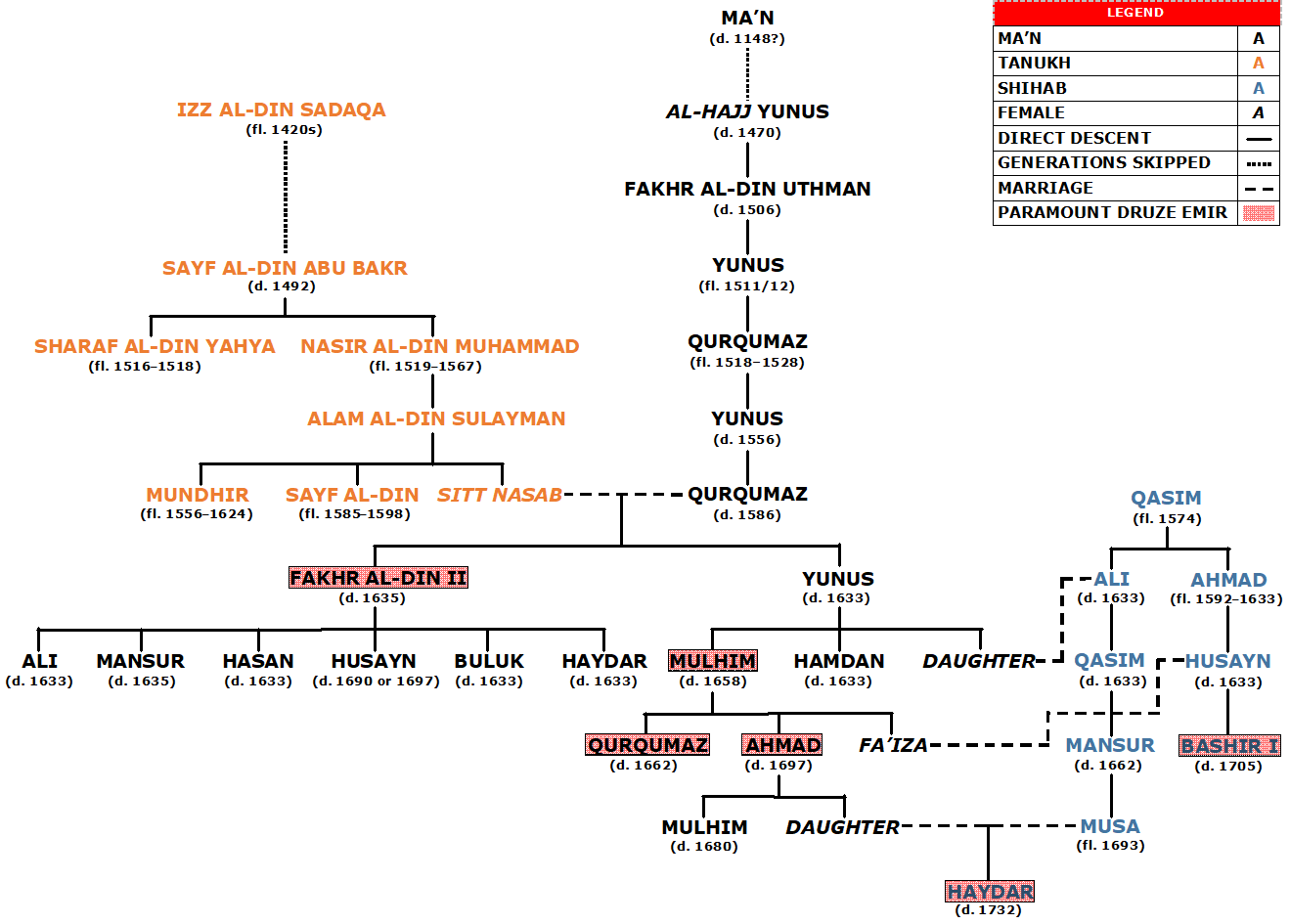
Genealogical tree showing the marital ties between the Ma'n and Shihab dynasties, with the paramount emirs of the Druze shaded in red. The Shihabi emirs Bashir I and Haydar were successors of the Ma'ns

When Emir Ahmad Ma'n died without a male heir in 1697, the sheikhs of the Qaysi Druze faction of Mount Lebanon, including the Jumblatt clan, convened in Semqaniyeh and chose Bashir Shihab I to succeed Ahmad as emir of Mountain Lebanon. Bashir was related to the Ma'ns through his mother, who was the sister of Ahmad Ma'n and the wife of Bashir's father, Husayn Shihab. Due to the influence of Husayn Ma'n, the youngest of Fakhr ad-Din's sons, who was a high-ranking official in the Ottoman imperial government, the Ottoman authorities declined to confirm Bashir's authority over the tax farms of Mount Lebanon; Husayn Ma'n forsake his hereditary claim to the Ma'n emirate in favor of his career as the Ottoman ambassador to India. Instead, the Ottoman authorities appointed Husayn Ma'n's choice, Haydar Shihab, the son of Musa Shihab and Ahmad Ma'n's daughter. Haydar's appointment was confirmed by the governor of Sidon, and agreed upon by the Druze sheikhs, but because Haydar was still a minor, Bashir was kept on as regent.

The transfer of the Ma'n emirate to the Shihabs made the family's chief the holder of a large tax farm that included the Chouf, Gharb, Matn and Keserwan areas of Mount Lebanon. However, the tax farm was not owned by the Shihabi emir and was subject to annual renewal by the Ottoman authorities, who made the ultimate decision to confirm the existing holder or assign the tax farm to another holder, often another Shihab emir or a member of the rival Alam al-Din clan. The Qaysi Druze were motivated to appoint the Shihabs because the Wadi al-Taym-based Shihabs were not involved in the intertribal machinations of the Chouf, their military strength, and their marital ties to the Ma'ns. Other clans, including the Druze Jumblatts and the Maronite Khazens were subsidiary tax farmers, known as muqata'jis, who paid the Ottoman government via the Shihabs. A branch of the Shihab family continued to control Wadi al-Taym, while the Shihabs in Mount Lebanon made Deir al-Qamar their headquarters. The Shihab emir was also formally at the military service of the Ottoman authorities and was required to mobilize forces upon request. The Shihabs' new status made them the preeminent social, fiscal, military, judicial and political power in Mount Lebanon.

In 1698, Bashir gave protection to the Hamade sheikhs when they were sought out by the authorities and successfully mediated between the two sides. He also captured the rebel Mushrif ibn Ali al-Saghir, sheikh of the Shia Muslim Wa'il clan of Bilad Bishara in Jabal Amil (modern South Lebanon), and delivered him and his partisans to the governor of Sidon, who requested Bashir's assistance in the matter. As a result, Bashir was officially endowed with responsibility for the "safekeeping of Sidon Province" between the region of Safad to Keserwan. At the turn of the 18th century, the new governor of Sidon, Arslan Mataraci Pasha, continued the good relationship with Bashir, who by then had appointed a fellow Sunni Muslim Qaysi, Umar al-Zaydani, as the subsidiary tax farmer of Safad. He also secured the allegiance of the Shia Muslim Munkir and Sa'b clans to the Qaysi faction. Bashir was poisoned and died in 1705. The 17th-century Maronite Patriarch and historian, Istifan al-Duwayhi, asserts Haydar, who had since reached adulthood, was responsible for Bashir's death.

=== Reign of Haydar ===
Emir Haydar's coming to power brought about an immediate effort on the part of Sidon's governor, Bashir Pasha, a relative of Arlsan Mehmed Pasha, to roll back Shihab authority in the province. To that end, the governor directly appointed Zahir al-Umar, Umar al-Zaydani's son, as the tax farmer of Safad, and directly appointed members of the Wa'il, Munkir and Sa'ab clans as tax farmers of Jabal Amil's subdistricts. The latter two clans thereafter joined the Wa'il's and their pro-Yamani faction. The situation worsened for Emir Haydar when he was ousted by the order of Bashir Pasha and replaced with his Choufi Druze enforcer-turned enemy, Mahmoud Abi Harmoush in 1709. Emir Haydar and his Qaysi allies then fled to the Keserwani village of Ghazir, where they were given protection by the Maronite Hubaysh clan, while Mount Lebanon was overrun by a Yamani coalition led by the Alam al-Din clan. Emir Haydar fled further north to Hermel when Abi Harmoush's forces pursued him to Ghazir, which was plundered.

In 1711, the Qaysi Druze clans mobilized to restore their predominance in Mount Lebanon, and invited Emir Haydar to return and lead their forces. Emir Haydar and the Abu'l Lama family mobilized at Ras al-Matn and were joined by the Jumblatt, Talhuq, Imad, Nakad and Abd al-Malik clans, while the Yamani faction led by Abi Harmoush mobilized at Ain Dara. The Yaman received backing from the governors of Damascus and Sidon, but before the governors' forces joined the Yaman to launch a pincer attack against the Qaysi camp at Ras al-Matn, Emir Haydar launched a preemptive assault against Ain Dara. In the ensuing Battle of Ain Dara, the Yamani forces were routed, the Alam al-Din sheikhs were slain, Abi Harmoush was captured and the Ottoman governors withdrew their forces from Mount Lebanon. Emir Haydar's victory consolidated Shihab political power and the Yamani Druze were eliminated as a rival force; they were forced to leave Mount Lebanon for the Hauran.

Emir Haydar confirmed his Qaysi allies as the tax farmers of Mount Lebanon's tax districts. His victory in Ain Dara also contributed to the rise of the Maronite population in the area, as the newcomers from Tripoli's hinterland replaced the Yamani Druze and Druze numbers decreased due to the Yamani exodus. Thus, an increasing number of Maronite peasants became tenants of the mostly Druze landlords of Mount Lebanon. The Shihabs became the paramount force in Mount Lebanon's social and political configuration as they were the supreme landlords of the area and the principal intermediaries between the local sheikhs and the Ottoman authorities. This arrangement was embraced by the Ottoman governors of Sidon, Tripoli and Damascus. In addition to Mount Lebanon, the Shihabs exercised influence and maintained alliances with the various local powers of the mountain's environs, such as with the Shia Muslim clans of Jabal Amil and the Beqaa Valley, the Maronite-dominated countryside of Tripoli, and the Ottoman administrators of the port cities of Sidon, Beirut and Tripoli.

=== Reign of Mulhim ===
Emir Haydar died in 1732 and was succeeded by his eldest son, Mulhim. One of Emir Mulhim's early actions was a punitive expedition against the Wa'il clan of Jabal Amil. The Wa'il kinsmen had painted their horses' tails green in celebration of Emir Haydar's death (Emir Haydar's relations with the Wa'il clan had been poor) and Emir Mulhim took it as a grave insult. In the ensuing campaign, the Wa'ili sheikh, Nasif al-Nassar, was captured, albeit briefly. Emir Mulhim had the support of Sidon's governor in his actions in Jabal Amil.

Beginning in the 1740s, a new factionalism developed among the Druze clans. One faction was led by the Jumblatt clan and was known as the Jumblatti faction, while the Imad, Talhuq and Abd al-Malik clans formed the Imad-led Yazbak faction. Thus Qaysi-Yamani politics had been replaced with the Jumblatti-Yazbaki rivalry. In 1748, Emir Mulhim, under the orders of the governor of Damascus, burned properties belonging to the Talhuq and Abd al-Malik clans as punishment for the Yazbaki harboring of a fugitive from Damascus Eyalet. Afterward, Emir Mulhim compensated the Talhuqs. In 1749, he succeeded in adding the tax farm of Beirut to his domain, after persuading Sidon's governor to transfer the tax farm. He accomplished this by having the Talhuq clan raid the city and demonstrate the ineffectiveness of its deputy governor.

=== Power struggle for the emirate ===
Emir Mulhim became ill and was forced to resign in 1753 by his brothers, emirs Mansur and Ahmad, who were backed by the Druze sheikhs. Emir Mulhim retired in Beirut, but he and his son Qasim attempted to wrest back control of the emirate using his relationship with an imperial official. They were unsuccessful and Emir Mulhim died in 1759. The following year, Emir Qasim was appointed in place of Emir Mansur by the governor of Sidon. However, soon after, emirs Mansur and Ahmad bribed the governor and regained the Shihabi tax farm. Relations between the brothers soured as each sought paramountcy. Emir Ahmad rallied the support of the Yazbaki Druze, and was able to briefly oust Emir Mansur from the Shihabi headquarters in Deir al-Qamar. Emir Mansur, meanwhile, relied on the Jumblatti faction and the governor of Sidon, who mobilized his troops in Beirut in support of Emir Mansur. With this support, Emir Mansur retook Deir al-Qamar and Emir Ahmad fled. Sheikh Ali Jumblatt and Sheikh Yazbak Imad managed to reconcile emirs Ahmad and Mansur, with the former relinquishing his claim on the emirate and was permitted to reside in Deir al-Qamar.

Another son of Emir Mulhim, Emir Yusuf, had backed Emir Ahmad in his struggle and had his properties in Chouf confiscated by Emir Mansur. Emir Yusuf, who was raised as a Maronite Catholic but publicly presented himself as a Sunni Muslim, gained protection from Sheikh Ali Jumblatt in Moukhtara, and the latter attempted to reconcile Emir Yusuf with his uncle. Emir Mansur declined Sheikh Ali's mediation. Sa'ad al-Khuri, Emir Yusuf's mudabbir (manager), managed to persuade Sheikh Ali to withdraw his backing of Emir Mansur, while Emir Yusuf gained the support of Uthman Pasha al-Kurji, the governor of Damascus. The latter directed his son Mehmed Pasha al-Kurji, governor of Tripoli, to transfer the tax farms of Byblos and Batroun to Emir Yusuf in 1764. With the latter two tax farms, Emir Yusuf formed a power base in Tripoli's hinterland. Under al-Khuri's guidance and with Druze allies from Chouf, Emir Yusuf led a campaign against the Hamade sheikhs in support of the Maronite clans of Dahdah, Karam and Dahir and Maronite and Sunni Muslim peasants who, since 1759, were all revolting against the Hamade clan. Emir Yusuf defeated the Hamade sheikhs and appropriated their tax farms. This not only empowered Emir Yusuf in his conflict with Emir Mansur, but it also initiated Shihabi patronage over the Maronite bishops and monks who had resented Khazen influence over church affairs and been patronized by the Hamade sheikhs, the Shihab clan's erstwhile allies.

=== Reign of Yusuf ===
In 1770, Emir Mansur resigned in favor of Emir Yusuf after being compelled to step down by the Druze sheikhs. The transition was held at the village of Barouk, where the Shihabi emirs, Druze sheikhs and religious leaders met and drew up a petition to the governors of Damascus and Sidon, confirming Emir Yusuf's ascendancy. Emir Mansur's resignation was precipitated by his alliance with Sheikh Zahir al-Umar, the Zaydani strongman of northern Palestine, and Sheikh Nasif al-Nassar of Jabal Amil in their revolt against the Ottoman governors of Syria. Sheikh Zahir and the forces of Ali Bey al-Kabir of Egypt had occupied Damascus, but withdrew after Ali Bey's leading commander, Abu al-Dhahab, who was bribed by the Ottomans. Their defeat by the Ottomans made Emir Mansur a liability to the Druze sheikhs vis-a-vis their relations with the Ottoman authorities, so they decided to depose him. Emir Yusuf cultivated ties with Uthman Pasha and his sons in Tripoli and Sidon, and with their backing, sought to challenge the autonomous power of sheikhs Zahir and Nasif. However, Emir Yusuf experienced a series of major setbacks in his cause in 1771. His ally, Uthman Pasha, was routed in the Battle of Lake Hula by Sheikh Zahir's forces. Afterward, Emir Yusuf's large Druze force from Wadi al-Taym and Chouf was routed by Sheikh Nasif's Shia cavalrymen at Nabatieh. Druze casualties during the battle amounted to some 1,500 killed, a loss similar to that suffered by the Yamani coalition at Ain Dara. Furthermore, the forces of sheikhs Zahir and Nasif captured the town of Sidon after Sheikh Ali Jumblatt withdrew. Emir Yusuf's forces were again routed when they attempt oust sheikhs Zahir and Nasif, who had key backing from the Russian fleet, which bombarded Emir Yusuf's camp.

Uthman Pasha, seeking to prevent Beirut's fall to Sheikh Zahir, appointed Ahmad Pasha al-Jazzar, who was formerly in Emir Yusuf's service, as garrison commander of the city. Emir Yusuf, as tax farmer of Beirut, agreed to the appointment and declined a bounty on al-Jazzar by Abu al-Dhahab (al-Jazzar was wanted by the Mamluk strongmen of Ottoman Egypt). However, al-Jazzar soon began acting independently after organizing the fortifications of Beirut, and Emir Yusuf appealed to Sheikh Zahir through Emir Mansur's liaising to request Russian bombardment of Beirut and oust al-Jazzar. Sheikh Zahir and the Russians acceded to Emir Yusuf's request after a large bribe was paid to them. After a four-month siege, al-Jazzar withdrew from Beirut in 1772, and Emir Yusuf penalized his Yazbaki allies, sheikhs Abd al-Salam Imad and Husayn Talhuq to compensate for the bribe he paid to the Russians. The following year, Emir Yusuf's brother, Emir Sayyid-Ahmad, took control of Qabb Ilyas and robbed a group of Damascene merchants passing through the village. Emir Yusuf subsequently captured Qabb Ilyas from his brother, and was transferred the tax farm for the Beqaa Valley by the governor of Damascus, Muhammad Pasha al-Azm.

In 1775, Sheikh Zahir was defeated and killed in an Ottoman campaign, and al-Jazzar was installed in Sheikh Zahir's Acre headquarters, and soon after, was appointed governor of Sidon. Among al-Jazzar's principal goals was to centralize authority in Sidon Eyalet and assert control over the Shihabi emirate in Mount Lebanon. To that end, he succeeded in ousting Emir Yusuf from Beirut and removing it from the Shihabi tax farm. Moreover, al-Jazzar took advantage and manipulated divisions among the Shihab emirs in order to break up the Shihabi emirate into weaker entities that he could more easily exploit for revenue. In 1778 he agreed to sell the Chouf tax farm to Emir Yusuf's brothers, emirs Sayyid-Ahmad and Effendi after the latter two gained the support of the Jumblatt and Nakad clans (Emir Yusuf's ally Sheikh Ali Jumblatt died that year). Emir Yusuf, thereafter, based himself in Ghazir and mobilized the support of his Sunni Muslim allies, the Ra'ad and Mir'ibi clans from Akkar. Al-Jazzar restored the Chouf to Emir Yusuf after he paid a large bribe, but his brothers again challenged him 1780. That time they mobilized the support of both the Jumblatti and Yazbaki factions, but their attempt to kill Sa'ad al-Khuri failed, and Effendi was killed. In addition, Emir Yusuf paid al-Jazzar to loan him troops, bribed the Yazbaki faction to defect from his Sayyid-Ahmad's forces and once again secured control of the Shihabi emirate.

=== Reign of Bashir II ===
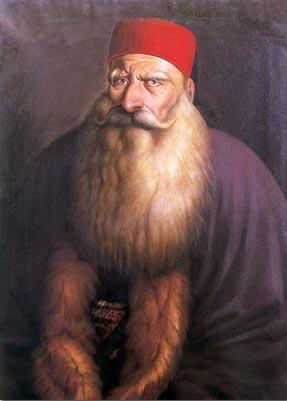
Bashir Shihab II was the Emir of Mount Lebanon from 1789 until 1840.

The most prominent among the Shihabi emirs was Emir Bashir Shihab II, who was comparable to Fakhr ad-Din II. His ability as a statesman was first tested in 1799, when Napoleon besieged Acre, a well-fortified coastal city in Palestine, about forty kilometers south of Tyre. Both Napoleon and Ahmad Pasha al-Jazzar, the governor of Sidon, requested assistance from Bashir, who remained neutral, declining to assist either combatant. Unable to conquer Acre, Napoleon returned to Egypt, and the death of Al-Jazzar in 1804 removed Bashir's principal opponent in the area. When Bashir II decided to break away from the Ottoman Empire, he allied himself with Muhammad Ali Pasha, the founder of modern Egypt, and assisted Muhammad Ali's son, Ibrahim Pasha, in another siege of Acre. This siege lasted seven months, the city falling on May 27, 1832. The Egyptian army, with assistance from Bashir's troops, also attacked and conquered Damascus on June 14, 1832.

The reign of Bashir II saw an economic shift in the mountain regions from a feudal to a cash crop system, in which Beiruti merchants (largely Sunni and Christian) loaned money to peasants, freeing them from dependence on their feudal mountain lords and contributing to the development of a handicraft economy with the growing specialization of agriculture.

In 1840, four of the principal European powers (Britain, Austria, Prussia, and Russia), opposing the pro-Egyptian policy of the French, signed the London Treaty with the Sublime Porte (the Ottoman ruler) on July 15, 1840. According to the terms of this treaty, Muhammad Ali was asked to leave Syria; when he rejected this request, Ottoman and British troops landed on the Lebanese coast on September 10, 1840. Faced with this combined force, Muhammad Ali retreated, and on October 14, 1840, Bashir II surrendered to the British and went into exile. Bashir Shihab III was then appointed. On January 13, 1842, the sultan deposed Bashir III and appointed Omar Pasha as governor of Mount Lebanon. This event marked the end of the rule of the Shihabs.

== Lebanon under Egyptian occupation ==
After the failure to put down the insurrection in some of the Greek provinces of the Ottoman Empire due to the intervention of European powers sinking his naval fleet at the Battle of Navarino, the wāli of Egypt, Muhammad Ali, sought the province of Syria. Muhammad Ali believed that Syria was promised as a prize for helping the Greeks, but Sultan Mahmud disagreed and only appointed him the pashalik of Crete. Muhammad Ali raised an army under his son Ibrahim Pasha to occupy the province and bring it under Egyptian control. Bashir II had sought refuge in Egypt during the aforementioned troubled times in Lebanon from 1821 to 1822 and had become an ally of Muhammad Ali, thus his help was sought to help secure Egyptian rule in the province. During the occupation, Ibrahim Pasha and Bashir II enacted high taxes, eventually producing resistance, and Bashir II's provision of Christian forces in battles against the Druze may have served as a source of future sectarian tensions. Bashir II had previously attempted to not appear as favoring the Maronites to the degree that he was required to under the Egyptian occupation, however as his help was required to hold the territory, Muhammad Ali was insistent that he provide forces to his son, even threatening Bashir II personally when he appeared to be hesitating in bringing his soldiers. The occupation also introduced social measures that raised the legal rights of Christians in the area and imposed conscription and disarmament.

== Sectarian conflict ==
=== 1840 conflict in Mount Lebanon ===
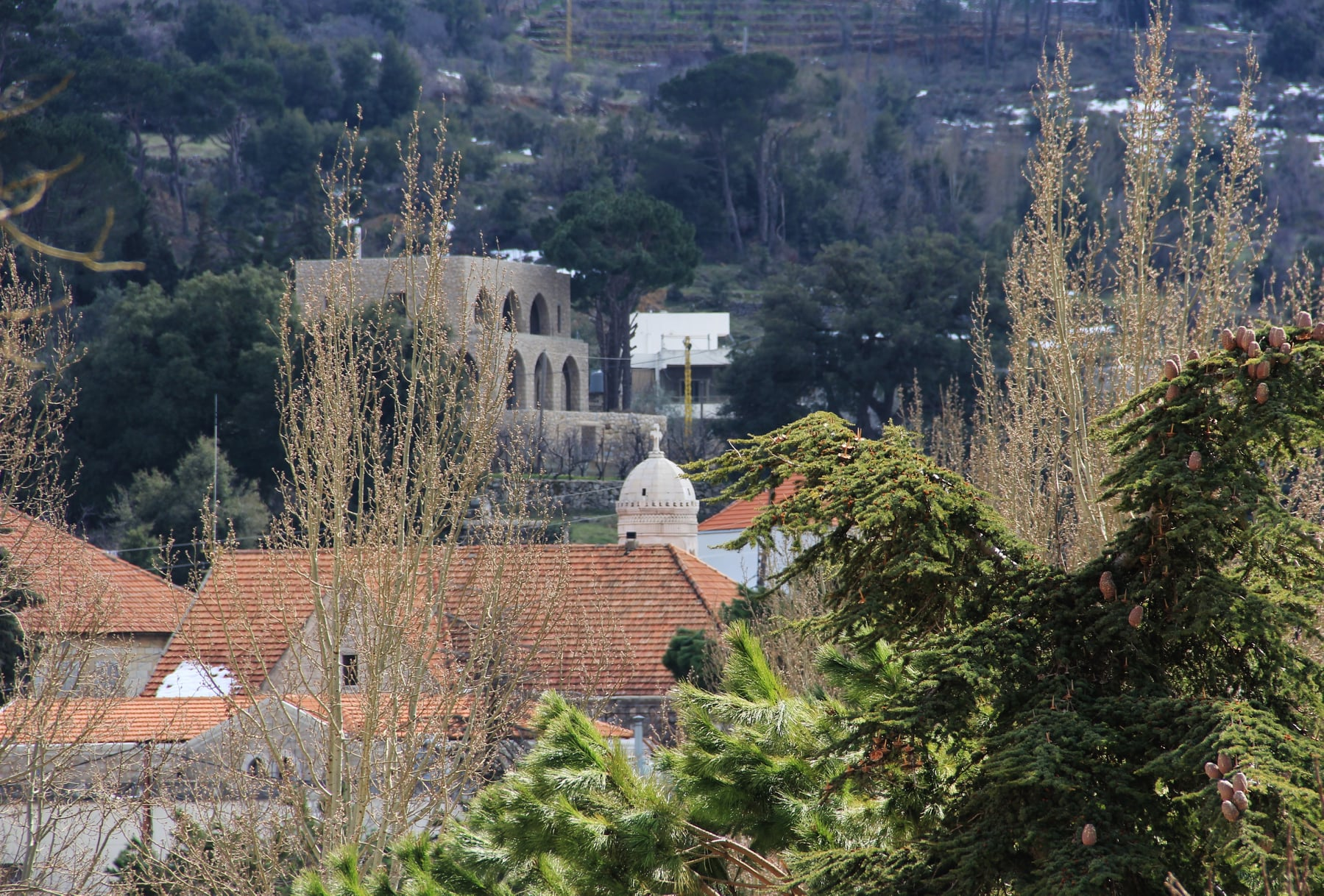
Christian church and Druze Khalwa in Shuf. The Druzes and the Maronites in Shuf lived in harmony with the exception of some periods.

The relationship between the Druze and Christians has been characterized by harmony and peaceful coexistence, with amicable relations between the two groups prevailing throughout history.

On 3 September 1840, Bashir III was appointed amir of Mount Lebanon by the Ottoman sultan. Geographically, Mount Lebanon represents the central part of present-day Lebanon, which historically has had a Christian majority. Greater Lebanon, on the other hand, created at the expense of Greater Syria, was formally constituted under the League of Nations mandate granted to France in 1920 and includes the Biqa Valley, Beirut, southern Lebanon (up to the border with modern Israel), and northern Lebanon (up to the border with Syria). In practice, the terms Lebanon and Mount Lebanon tend to be used interchangeably by historians until the formal establishment of the Mandate.

Bitter conflicts between Maronites and Druzes, which had been simmering under Ibrahim Pasha's rule, resurfaced under the new amir. Hence, the sultan deposed Bashir III on 13 January 1842, and appointed Omar Pasha as governor of Mount Lebanon. This appointment, however, created more problems than it solved. In Mount Lebanon, France and Britain formed relationships with Maronite and Druze leaders respectively. While the Maronite and Druze communities remained subordinate to the House of Osman, they considered France and Britain to be their protectors. European powers took an Orientalist perspective to understand the dynamics in Mount Lebanon. British dispatches show that they incorrectly understood disputes between communities as stemming from tribal roots, without rational, which was a continuity of an ancestral conflict between the two groups. The French and British assumed that the Ottoman Empire was supporting and promoting Islamic animosity towards Christians. According to them, by creating conflict between Druze and Maronite communities, the Ottoman Empire could increase its dominance over the hinterland. However, the Ottoman Empire was struggling to control Mount Lebanon. Britain and France aimed to separate it into two provinces, one which was Druze territory and the other which was Maronite territory. On 7 December 1842, the sultan adopted the proposal and asked Assad Pasha, the governor (wali) of Beirut, to divide the region, then known as Mount Lebanon, into two districts: a northern district under a Christian deputy governor and a southern district under a Druze deputy governor. This arrangement came to be known as the Double Qaimaqamate. Both officials were to be responsible to the governor of Sidon, who resided in Beirut. The Beirut-Damascus highway was the dividing line between the two districts.

This partition raised tensions, because Druze lived in Maronite territory and Maronites lived in Druze territory. At the same time, the Maronites and Druze communities fought for dominance in Mount Lebanon. Animosities between the religious sects increased, nurtured by outside powers. The French, for example, supported the Maronites, while the British supported the Druzes, and the Ottomans fomented strife to increase their control. Not surprisingly, these tensions led to conflict between Christians and Druzes as early as May 1845. Consequently, the European powers requested that the Ottoman sultan establish order in Lebanon, and he attempted to do so by establishing a majlis (council) in each of the districts. Each majlis was composed of members who represented the different religious communities and was intended to assist the deputy governor.

This system failed to keep order when the peasants of Keserwan, overburdened by heavy taxes, rebelled against the feudal practices that prevailed in Mount Lebanon. In 1858 Tanyus Shahin and Abou Samra Ghanem, both Maronite peasant leaders, demanded that the feudal class abolish its privileges. When this demand was refused, the poor peasants revolted against the shaykhs of Mount Lebanon, pillaging the shaykhs' land and burning their homes.

=== Mount Lebanon Mutasarrifate ===
The division of Lebanon in two different religious communities mostly dissatisfied the Druze minority. Complaining about their lack of political and economic privileges. These factors and other factors led in to violent religious conflicts, eventually leading to the massacre of about 11.000 Maronites and the displacement of 100.000 as well as Greek Orthodox and Greek Catholics in 1860. Creating an opportunity for European powers to intervene in the region.

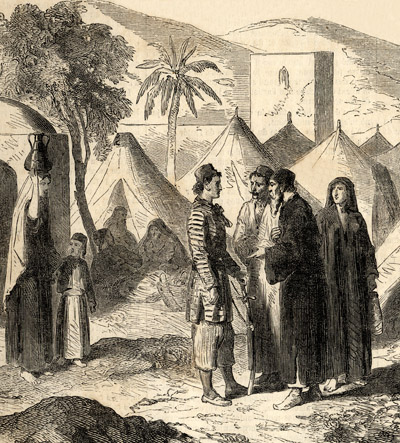
Christian refugees during the 1860 strife between Druze and Maronites in Lebanon.

When the news of the massacres reached Europe, especially France was horrified, and called for action to stop the massacre of the ‘innocent’ Christians. A series of international conventions known as the Règlement Organique were held. In July 1860 a conference in the name of humanity was held in Paris composed of France, Britain, Austria, Prussia, Russia and the Ottoman Empire. A protocol was adopted that provided for 12.000 soldiers from European countries (6000 of which French) to be dispatched to the region. The mandate was to ‘punish the guilty, secure reparations for the Christian losses and suggest reforms that would ensure order and security’. However, Fuad Pasha, the Ottoman official tasked with restoring order on Ottoman behalf, was able repress the violence before the arrival of the European forces.

On 5 October 1860, the participating nations reached an agreement on regional reforms. A new system of autonomy was found, known as the Mount Lebanon Mutasarrifiyya (governorate). Mount Lebanon was separated from Syria and gained new autonomy under a non-Lebanese Christian mutasarrif (governor) supported by an administrative council composed of twelve Lebanese locals, consisting out of members from the Lebanese religious communities (Druze, Greek Orthodox, Maronites, Greek Catholic, Sunni and Shia).

Mount Lebanon enjoyed now privileges not granted to other (bordering) districts in the region: The Mutasarrifiyya did not pay taxes to the central government; inhabitants were exempted from military service; law enforcement consisted of and was controlled by locals only; except for the governor, every official was a local and the official language of the administration was Arabic. However, Mount Lebanon had little arable lands. Now that the Mutasarrifiyya became more autonomous, it became dependent on neighboring districts for food supplies, means of living, and largely depended on Beirut’s port for imports and exports, and ideals to annex neighboring districts emerged. These neighboring regions that used to be under Shibabi rule together with Mount Lebanon desired to enjoy the similar rights to the Mutasarrifiyya. Keeping the Mutasarrifiyya and the effect it had on neighboring regions under control, in 1864, the Ottoman Empire decided to join the provinces of Damascus and Saida (the seat of which was Beirut) into one Province of Syria – uniting the districts bordering Mount Lebanon. In 1866 Mehmed Rashid Paşa was appointed governor of Syria. During his tenure he applied many reform measures to counterbalance the effect the establishment of the Mutasarrifiyya had on the region. It was only after World War One that the French agreed to attach the adjacent districts to Mount Lebanon and constitute the State of Greater Lebanon.

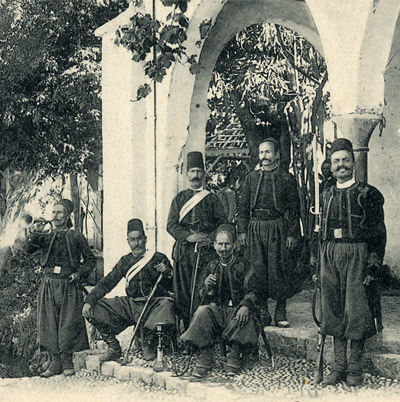
Lebanese soldiers during the Mutasarrifiyya period of Mount Lebanon

Restricted mainly to the mountains by the Mutasarrifiyya (district governed by a mutasarrif) arrangement and unable to make a living, many Lebanese Christians emigrated to Egypt and other parts of Africa and to North America, South America, and East Asia. Remittances from these Lebanese emigrants send to their relatives in Lebanon has continued to supplement the Lebanese economy to this day.

In addition to being a center of commercial and religious activity, Lebanon became an intellectual center in the second half of the nineteenth century. Foreign missionaries established schools throughout the country, with Beirut as the center of this renaissance. The American University of Beirut was founded in 1866, followed by the French St. Joseph's University in 1875. An intellectual guild that was formed at the same time gave new life to Arabic literature, which had stagnated under the Ottoman Empire. This new intellectual era was also marked by the appearance of numerous publications and by a highly prolific press.

The period was also marked by increased political activity. The harsh rule of Abdul Hamid II (1876–1909) prompted the Arab nationalists, both Christians and Muslims, in Beirut and Damascus to organize into clandestine political groups and parties. The Lebanese, however, had difficulties in deciding the best political course to advocate. Many Lebanese Christians were apprehensive of Turkish pan-Islamic policies, fearing a repetition of the 1860 massacres. Some, especially the Maronites, began to contemplate secession rather than the reform of the Ottoman Empire. Others, particularly the Greek Orthodox, advocated an independent Syria with Lebanon as a separate province within it, so as to avoid Maronite rule. A number of Lebanese Muslims, on the other hand, sought not to liberalize the Ottoman regime but to maintain it, as Sunni Muslims particularly liked to be identified with the caliphate. The Shias and Druzes, however, fearing minority status in a Turkish state, tended to favor an independent Lebanon or a continuation of the status quo.

Youssef Bey Karam, a Lebanese nationalist played an influential role in Lebanon's independence during this era.

Originally the Arab reformist groups hoped their nationalist aims would be supported by the Young Turks, who had staged a revolution in 1908–1909. Unfortunately, after seizing power, the Young Turks became increasingly repressive and nationalistic. They abandoned many of their liberal policies because of domestic opposition and Turkey's engagement in foreign wars between 1911 and 1913. Thus, the Arab nationalists could not count on the support of the Young Turks and instead were faced with opposition by the Turkish government.

== Foreign intervention in the 19th century and changing economic conditions ==
The tensions that burst into the sectarian conflict during the 1860s were set within the context of a fast-paced change in the established social order in the region. Under Bashir II, the agricultural economy of the Mount Lebanon region was brought into greater interdependence with the commercial economy of Beirut, altering the structure of feudal obligations and expanding the influence of cash crops. This created increased economic and political ties with France, leading to the French becoming an international patron of sorts to the Maronites of Lebanon.

The links that bind France and Lebanon date back centuries, and it's hard to ascertain when France first acted in Lebanon. Historians date this connection back to the first presence of French Jesuits on Mount Lebanon following their arrival in Syria in 1831. During the first part of the nineteenth century, exclusive Christian identity began to emerge on Mount Lebanon, and the Maronite church played a pivotal role in determining Lebanon's political history and the establishment of a Christian state in Lebanon in 1920. These Catholic communities ultimately established an extensive Jesuit education system in the area, with Université Saint Joseph serving as the first institution, founded in Beirut in 1875. The University exposed its students to a variety of academic subjects, which helped them develop a stronger sense of identity. To gain knowledge about their homeland, students at the University's Oriental Faculty studied archaeology, philology, and history. This long process has strengthened their national identity, and those same thinkers will later demand for the country's independence. The knowledge they received in those schools, as well as the elite that was developed as a result of it, spawned the first nationalist movement. Nujaym, an educated Maronite from Junie, one of the most influential of them, was arguing for the creation of a Greater Lebanon as an independent state. Nujaym's historical and geographical arguments on Lebanon had become a foundation for some intellectuals and politicians “national ambition". It had a direct impact on Lebanon by forming an elite that later governed the country by occupying most administrative and governmental positions, as well as working as a mediator between Lebanon and France, which was the country's mandatory authority at the time. They also contributed to the media by founding newspapers and magazines such as La revue Phénicienne in 1919, which went on to become one of Lebanon's most influential francophone publications.

This left the British to side with the Druze to the extent that a counterweight to France could be established in the region and that such tensions would not result in separatism that would threaten the integrity of the Ottoman Empire. The reforms within the Tanzimat also provided a source of increasing disagreement between Maronite and Druze populations. The European powers attempted to make sure the Tanzimat was interpreted as a mandate to protected Christians in the region and grant them great autonomy; while Druze elites interpreted the Tanzimat as restoring their traditional rights to rule the land.

Foreign actions in Lebanon were dominated by European countries like as England, Germany, and France, although non-European powers such as Russia were also involved. Its their interaction with the Ottoman Empire that would lead them to operate in the Mount Lebanon .During the late end of the 19th century, the Ottoman Empire's economy was deteriorating, the government was forced to seek loans from European banks in order to pay off its obligations. However, the agreements were that they had to trade with Europeans compagnies and lets them control different field or part of their territory this including the mount Lebanon. The railroad trade is one illustration of European countries' worldwide expansion; It originally started in 1888 when the building of Anatolian Railway leading to Baghdad was granted to German developers. Later in 1889, German and French came to an agreement and decided to equally divide the ownership of that new railroad company. This project, also known as the Baghdad Railway, later opened the way for the French mandate. Therefore, in 1902 French firms were at the head of five railroad that ran throughout Greater Syria, which comprised Lebanon, Syria, Jordan, and Israel at the time. At the same time as the railroads were being built, the Turks acquired control of the Ottoman government and took on greater debt. This economic instability prompted them to sign a general agreement on April 9, 1914, in which France agreed to lend the Ottoman Empire 800 million francs in exchange for the Turkish signature over the concession granted to France in two prior agreements signed in September 1913. These concessions included the right to construct 1790 kilometers of new railways, as well as the restoration of all privileges granted to French charities and religious organizations in Syria and Lebanon. It strengthened the French legitimacy within the country and facilitated the creation of the French Mandate later.

== World War I and the French Mandate ==
The outbreak of World War I in August 1914 brought famine to Lebanon, mainly resulting from a Turkish land blockade and confiscations. It killed an estimated third to half of the predominantly Maronite population over the next four years.

Pasha pursued a harsh reign, executing dozens on grounds of political activity. This politically suppressive rule led to mass executions in Beirut and Damascus on 6 May 1916. Fourteen inhabitants from Beirut were hanged in the public square. Since the sectarian conflict of 1860, Lebanon had not seen such acts of violence as these. The mass executions created momentum and strengthened Arab nationalism, striving for Arab political independence. The Turkish Army also cut down trees for wood to fuel trains or for military purposes. 6 May is a commemoration day known as Martyr's Day, Martyrs' Square in Beirut is named after this day.

The end of Ottoman rule in Lebanon began in September 1918 when French forces landed on the Lebanese coast, and the British moved into Palestine, opening the way for the liberation of Syria and Lebanon from Turkish rule. At the San Remo Conference in Italy in April 1920, the Allies gave France a mandate over Greater Syria. France then appointed General Henri Gouraud to implement the mandate provisions.

== See also ==
- Mount Lebanon Mutasarrifate
- Turks in Lebanon
- Maronite-Druze dualism
