= Houmal =

Houmal حومال
- Location in Lebanon
- Coordinates: 33°48′36″N 35°33′40″E
- Country: Lebanon
- Governorate: Mount Lebanon Governorate
- District: Aley District

Area
  - Total: 0.31 sq mi (0.79 km^{2})
- Elevation: 1,300 ft (400 m)
- Time zone: UTC+2 (EET)
  - Summer (DST): +3

Houmal (Arabic: حومال, romanized: Ḥūmāl) is a town in Mount Lebanon which makes up one of the 70 towns and villages in the district of Aley. It is 400 meters above sea level and 25 kilometres from the capital Beirut. It is both a Summer holiday location as well as being inhabited during the Winter months. It has proximity to the capital of Lebanon, Beirut.

== History ==
In 1838, Eli Smith noted the place, called Humal, located in El-Ghurb el-Fokany; Upper el-Ghurb.

== Educational institutions ==
- Bdadoun Public School

Founded in 1921 by Selim Nouhra. It later became a public school.

- Ecole Saint Elie

Founded in 1941 by Elias Tannous who donated the land to Saint Famille Maronite nuns.

== Geography ==
Houmal's bordering towns are Blaybel, Bdadoun, and Wadi Chahrour. Kahale and Kfarshima are close by.

== Bibliography ==
- Robinson, E.; Smith, E. (1841). Biblical Researches in Palestine, Mount Sinai and Arabia Petraea: A Journal of Travels in the year 1838. Vol. 3. Boston: Crocker & Brewster.
