= Jamil Molaeb =

Lebanese painter

- جميل ملاعب
- Born: 1948 (age 77–78); Baissour, Lebanon
- Education: Lebanese University, Beirut; Pratt Institute, New York City; Ohio State University

Jamil Molaeb (born 1948; Arabic: جميل ملاعب, romanized: Jamīl Mulāʿib) is a Lebanese artist.

== Life ==
Molaeb was born in 1948 in Baissour in Aley District, in the Chouf historic region of Lebanon, where he still lives. He studied in the faculty of fine arts of the Lebanese University in Beirut, where he worked under Paul Guiragossian and Chafic Abboud. He spent a year in Algeria in the 1970s.

In 1984 he signed up for an MFA at the Pratt Institute in New York City, in the United States, after which he completed a doctorate in art education at Ohio State University. He returned to Lebanon in 1989 and began teaching at the Lebanese American University and at the national Lebanese University in Beirut. Between 1991 and 1992 he was secretary of the Lebanese Artists Association for Painters & Sculptors.

== Work ==
Molaeb has made drawings, mosaics, sculptures and wood-cuts as well as paintings. His style is flexible; some of his work shows the influence of Ancient Egyptian, Babylonian and Sumerian art.

He received a sculpture award from the Sursock Museum in the 1960s.
