= Al-Nreijat =

Village in Aley District in the Mount Lebanon Governorate of Lebanon

Al Nreijat (Arabic: النريجات, romanized: an-Nrayjāt, locally an-Nrējāt), is a village in Aley District in the Mount Lebanon Governorate of Lebanon.
