= Baissour, Aley =

Village in the Aley District of Lebanon

Baissour بيصور Bayssour
- Location in Lebanon
- Coordinates: 33°45′55″N 35°34′03″E
- Country: Lebanon
- Governorate: Mount Lebanon Governorate
- District: Aley District

Area
  - Total: 2.43 sq mi (6.29 km^{2})
- Elevation: 2,460 ft (750 m)
- Time zone: UTC+2 (EST)
  - Summer (DST): +3

Baissour or Bayssour (Arabic: بيصور, romanized: Bayṣṣūr) is a village located in the Aley District of Mount Lebanon. It is 850 metres (2,790 ft) above sea level, and shares a border with Aley, Kaifoun, Kabr Shmoon, Majdlaya, and Ainab.

Baissour River (نهر بيصور, Naher Baissour) is home to many restaurants and resorts. Thousands of tourists visit Baissour every year, and along with the restaurants along the river, one of the biggest attractions is the Radar area. This beautiful, mountainous, tree covered picnic and recreational area is located at the highest point of Baissour and is accessible year round.

== History ==
In 1838, Eli Smith noted the place, called Beisur, located in Aklim es-Sahhar, between el-Ghurb and el-Jurd.

== See also ==
- Jamil Molaeb
- Ghazi Aridi
- Druze in Lebanon

== Bibliography ==
- Robinson, E.; Smith, E. (1841). Biblical Researches in Palestine, Mount Sinai and Arabia Petraea: A Journal of Travels in the year 1838. Vol. 3. Boston: Crocker & Brewster.
