= Baawerta =

Baourta بعورته Baawerta
- Location in Lebanon
- Coordinates: 33°44′14″N 35°30′05″E
- Country: Lebanon
- Governorate: Mount Lebanon Governorate
- District: Aley District

Area
  - Total: 2.48 sq mi (6.43 km^{2})
- Elevation: 1,770 ft (540 m)
- Time zone: UTC+2 (EST)
  - Summer (DST): +3

Baawerta (Arabic: بعورتة, romanized: Baʿwirtah), also called Baawerti or Baaouerta is a Lebanese village located on Mount Lebanon in the Aley district. It neighbors the city of Damour and the villages of Abey and Daqqoun. At an elevation of approximately 540 metres (1,770 ft), it overlooks Beirut. Cities close to Baawerta also include Sidon, and Aley. Baawerta contains a cable factory, a granite factory and many living compounds including the Nova Brasilia compound.

== History ==
In 1838, Eli Smith noted the place, called Ba'wirtheh, located in Aklim es-Sahhar, between el-Ghurb and el-Jurd.

In 2010, Baawerta suffered from a forest fire that burned extensive parts of its surrounding forest. Baawerta is a few kilometers away from the Naameh Landfill, which has caused a number of problems within the village. Consequently, the Parliament enacted a law to financially support the municipalities surrounding the landfill, of which Baawerta is included. Baawerta had a group of people who initiated a revolution against the political decision of Walid Jumblatt and other powerful politicians known to be benefiting from Nahmeh landfill and succeeded to attract people from all over Lebanon. They succeeded in blocking - for more than 30 days - the entrance to the landfill with their bodies. As a result, in January 2017, the Landfill was completely closed permanently. The significance of that move by the people of Baawerta was that it paved the way to many anti-corruption strikes that spread all over Lebanon since then. Those strikes lead to the brightest image on the 17th of October 2019 revolution against the whole regime.

== Bibliography ==
- Robinson, E.; Smith, E. (1841). Biblical Researches in Palestine, Mount Sinai and Arabia Petraea: A Journal of Travels in the year 1838. Vol. 3. Boston: Crocker & Brewster.
