= Ain Dara, Lebanon =

Ain Dara عين داره
- Village
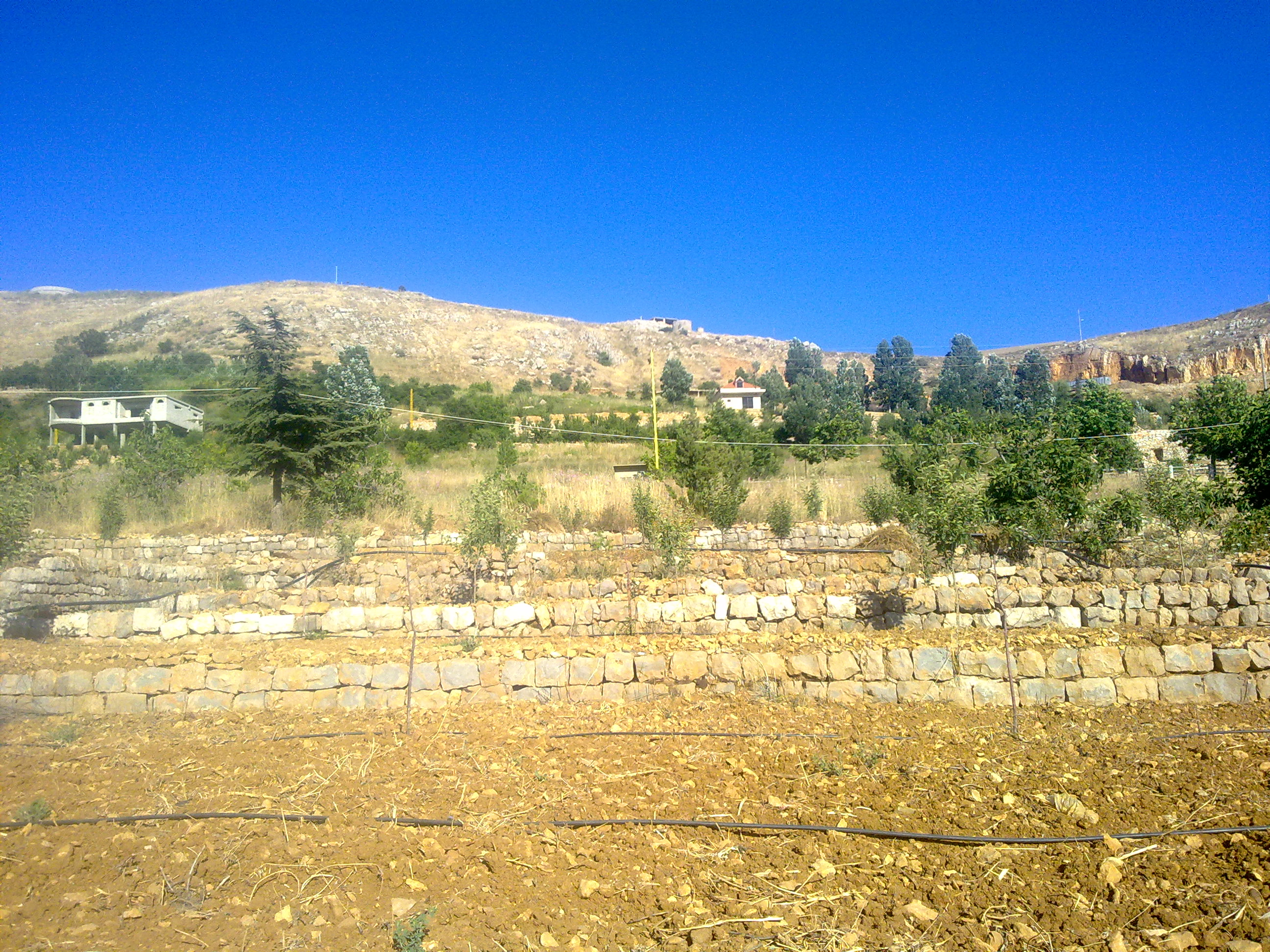
- Ain Dara

- Location in Lebanon
- Coordinates: 33°47′N 35°43′E
- Country: Lebanon
- Governorate: Mount Lebanon Governorate
- District: Aley District
- Elevation: 4,300 ft (1,300 m)
- Time zone: UTC+2 (EET)
  - Summer (DST): +3
- Dialing code: +961

Ain Dara (Arabic: عين داره, romanized: ʿAyn Dāra), is a village about 30 kilometres (19 mi) from Beirut, in the governorate of Mount Lebanon, in the Aley District. Ain Dara Municipality has an area of 2,586 hectares (9.98 mi^{2}), with a population of approximately 8000 persons (1700 emigrants). It had 3,874 registered voters in 2010. Originally a Druze village, Ain Dara today is a mixed Druze and Christian village, with a Christian majority, as per the recent registered voters.

Ain Dara is located on a southward facing slope overlooking the pine forests of the Safa valley with an average altitude of 1,250 metres (4,100 ft) above sea level. It is close to Mount Barouk, which is famous for its cedar forest. Its altitude gives it cool summers and cold winters with heavy snowfall.

Some well-known places surrounding Ain Dara are Hammana and Mdeirej to the north, Aghmeed and Bmahray to the south, Dahr al-Baydar to the east and Saoufar to the west.

Ain Dara is known for the famous Battle of Ain Dara that took place in 1711 between the two major parties of the time; the Qaysis and the Yemenis, resulting in a total Qaysi victory under the leadership of Emir Haidar Chehab; a victory that decisively established the Chehabi rule for the next 150 years.

On May 27th, 1860, a group of 3000 Maronites decided to attack the Druze in the Druze heartland. On their way, they fought a group of 600 Druze forces in Ain Dara. The Christians lost and the Druze came out with a significant and decisive victory. Later on, on July the 2nd, the Druze attacked Zahle, the last Christian stronghold (they had attacked other Christian villages after their victory at Ain Dara). They defeated the Christians in Zahle, taking control of Mount Lebanon. When news of the fall of Zahle reached Damascus, the Damascenes celebrated “as if the empire had conquered Russia” Source: the Arabs, a history by Eugene Rogan, page 94-5

== Places of worship ==
- Druze Khalwat: Khalwat Zeitouni, Atallah

Ain Dara also contains five churches :

- Saint George (gerges) Maronite Church (The oldest church in the village 1890 AD)
- Saint Mary (al saydeh) Maronite Church
- Saint George (gawergios) Orthodox Church, Father Ghassan Haddad.
- Saint Elie (elias) Orthodox Church, Father Ghassan Haddad
- Church of the Assumption, Orthodox Church, Father Ghassan Haddad
- Aindara Evangelical Baptist Church.

== Nature and cultural attractions ==
Natural and Cultural Attractions are:

- El-Okeili Historical Square
- Ancient Churches: Mar Gerges - Maronite Church, Mar Gerges Orthodox Church
- Druze hermitage site: Makam Shaykh Badereddin El Enderi (The first Shaykh Akl of the Druze)
- Qoubat Al-Sitt
- Ancient village of Tayroush
- Natural water sources: Ain Barakeh, Ain Al Tarcha, Ain Majed, Ain Al-Kakbi, Ain Al-Tamam, Hafr Al Tannour, Bahsasa, Ain Al Bustan, Ain Al Hammam, Ain Al Wosta
- Al Dayaa Grottos
- Pine Forest

== Families ==
Families of Ain Dara include: Atallah, Bader, Bou Faissal, Faisal, Haddad, Haidamous, Wehbeh, Yammine, Zakharia, Zeitouni

== Additional information ==
Ain Dara has 3 schools: - 1 public and 2 private. There are no hospitals in Ain Dara.
