= Remhala =

Village in Lebanon

Remhala, also spelled Rimhala (Arabic: رمحالا), is a village in Lebanon. It is located in the Aley District of the Mount Lebanon Governorate.

== Etymology ==
The name Remhala is said to derive its origin from Syriac word for "sandy hill".

== Population ==
Remhala has a resident population of roughly two thousand people, predominantly Maronites. As of 31 March 2024, the town contains 747 registered Syrian refugees.

== Notable people ==
- Samir Yazbek (1939–2016), singer and composer.
