= Ainab =

Ainab عيناب
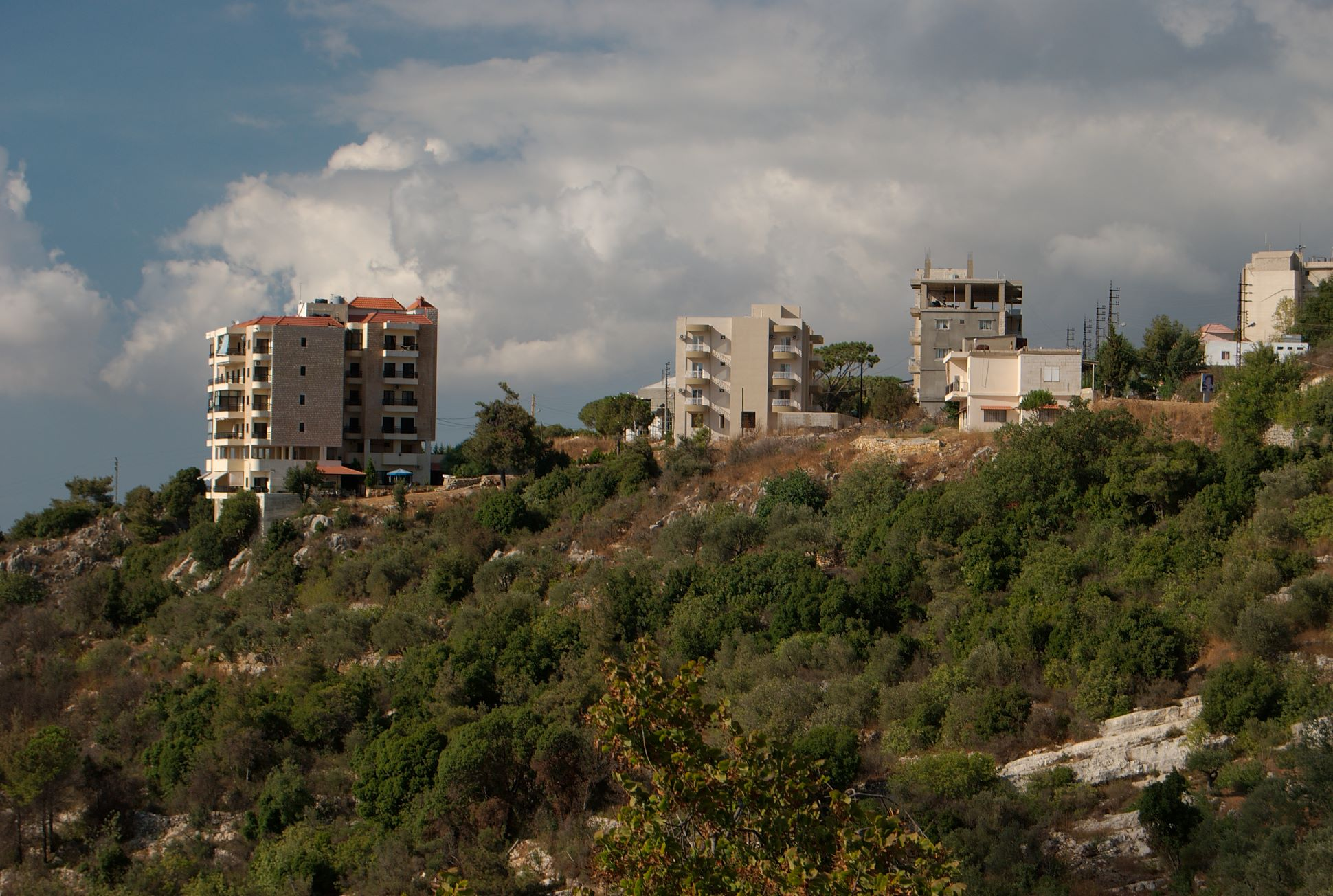

- Location in Lebanon
- Coordinates: 33°45′56.95″N 35°32′55″E
- Country: Lebanon
- Governorate: Mount Lebanon Governorate
- District: Aley District

Area
  - Total: 1 km^{2} (0.39 sq mi)
- Elevation: 750 m (2,460 ft)

Population (2004)
  - Total: 3,000
- Time zone: UTC+2 (EET)
  - Summer (DST): +3
- Website: ainab.net

Ainab (Arabic: عيناب), is a town on the western slopes of Mount Lebanon overlooking Beirut. It is in the Aley District of the Mount Lebanon Governorate 25 kilometres (16 mi) from Beirut, on the road South from Aley.

== History ==
In 1838, Eli Smith noted the place, called 'Ainab, located in El-Ghurb el-Fokany, upper el-Ghurb.

The municipal council was established in 1910 and is one of the earliest councils in the Aley district.

Ainab was the site of numerous conflicts before and during the Lebanese civil war. In the 1958 Lebanon crisis control of the town was fought over by the Druze forces of Kamal Jumblatt and the Lebanese Government. During the Israeli invasion (1982 Lebanon War), the Israeli army intervened in and near Ainab in fighting between the Druze Progressive Socialist Party and the Christian Kataeb Party. In March 1989, a schoolyard in the town was hit by an Israeli air-to-surface missile during strikes against a base of the Democratic Front for the Liberation of Palestine (DFLP) in Shemlan. Press reports state that 3 people were killed 22 schoolchildren wounded, or that two DFLP fighters were killed, and a civilian and 23 of 75 primary age schoolchildren wounded by shrapnel. Later that year Israeli jets again attacked in apparent retaliation for rocket attacks on Northern Israel.

== See also ==
- Druze in Lebanon

== Bibliography ==
- Robinson, E.; Smith, E. (1841). Biblical Researches in Palestine, Mount Sinai and Arabia Petraea: A Journal of Travels in the year 1838. Vol. 3. Boston: Crocker & Brewster.
