= Silfaya =

Village in Aley District in the Mount Lebanon Governorate of Lebanon

Silfaya سلفايا
- Coordinates: 33°44′N 35°34′E
- Country: Lebanon
- Governorate: Mount Lebanon
- District: Aley

Silfaya or Selfaya (Arabic: سلفايا, romanized: Silfāyā) is a village in Aley District in the Mount Lebanon Governorate of Lebanon. It is a predominantly Maronite community. As of 2022, the settlement had 1,128 registered voters, 95 of whom were registered Diaspora voters.
