= Al-Azzounieh =

Village in Lebanon

Coordinates: 33.7730°N 35.7062°E

Al-Azzounieh (Levantine Arabic: العزونية, romanized: al-ʿAzzūniyeh) is a village in Aley District in the Mount Lebanon Governorate of Lebanon. Its inhabitants are predominantly Druze.
