= Nabaa Al Safa =

Village in Chouf District in the Mount Lebanon Governorate of Lebanon

Nabaa Al Safa نبع الصفا
- City
- Location within Lebanon
- Coordinates: 33°44′59″N 35°41′55″E
- Country: Lebanon
- Governorate: Mount Lebanon Governorate
- District: Aley District
- Time zone: UTC+2 (EET)
  - Summer (DST): UTC+3 (EEST)
- Dialing code: +961

Nabaa Al Safa (Arabic: نبع الصفا), is a village in Chouf District in the Mount Lebanon Governorate of Lebanon.
