= Basateen, Lebanon =

Human settlement in Lebanon

Coordinates: 33°45′46″N 35°31′47″E

Al Basateen (Standard Arabic: بساتين, romanized: Basātīn) is a village in Aley District in the Mount Lebanon Governorate of Lebanon.

== Location ==
Al Basateen is located in the Chahaar Region overlooking Beirut. Elevation is about 609 meters (1998 feet) above sea level. It offers beautiful views of the Mediterranean and Beirut. Access is easy from Beirut through Khaldeh and Aramoun.

== Information ==
Five families constitute the population of about 2000 or so; Ghosn, Rafeh, Abdelsalam, Merhi and Al Alia. Its Head of its municipality is Yaser Ghosn, and the members are: Faisal Rafeh, Ghassan Rafeh, Malika Ghosn, Akram Ghosn, Wissam Rafeh, Haitham Merhi, Katia Rafeh, Rami Rafeh. They were elected in 2016.
