= Bdadoun =

Bdadoun بدادون
- Location in Lebanon
- Coordinates: 33°48′36″N 35°33′40″E
- Country: Lebanon
- Governorate: Mount Lebanon Governorate
- District: Aley District
- Elevation: 1,610 ft (490 m)
- Time zone: UTC+2 (EET)
  - Summer (DST): +3

Bdadoun (Arabic: بدادون, romanized: Bdādūn) (also Bdadun, Bde‘doun), is a town in Mount Lebanon which makes up one of the 70 towns and villages in the Lebanese district of Aley. It has an estimated population of 3,000. It is 499 meters above sea level and 15 kilometres from the capital Beirut. It is known as a summer holiday location.

== Etymology ==
The name Bdadoun derives from the Phoenician noun Bd-Adoun (بِد-اَدون ) or "House of Adoun", the Canaanite god of the sun Adoun or Adonis, also known as Tammuz.

== History ==
In the year 1144, fighting erupted between the Christians in the North Lebanon regions of Jbeil and Keserwan districts. The king Barquq (الملك الظاهر برقوق) took the opportunity and ordered an invasion of that Christian dominated area. The result was an outflow of people that settled in the Chouf District. This region (especially the areas surrounding Beirut) was ruled by the Tanukhids (التنوخيّون). The Tanukhs (also called Buhturs) where the Druze hereditary lords of the Gharb (area surrounding Beirut). The Buhturs were replaced by the Ma'ans when the Ottomans conquered in the early 16th century. The area surrounding Bdadoun remained under autonomous Ottoman rule until the end of World War I.

== Agriculture ==
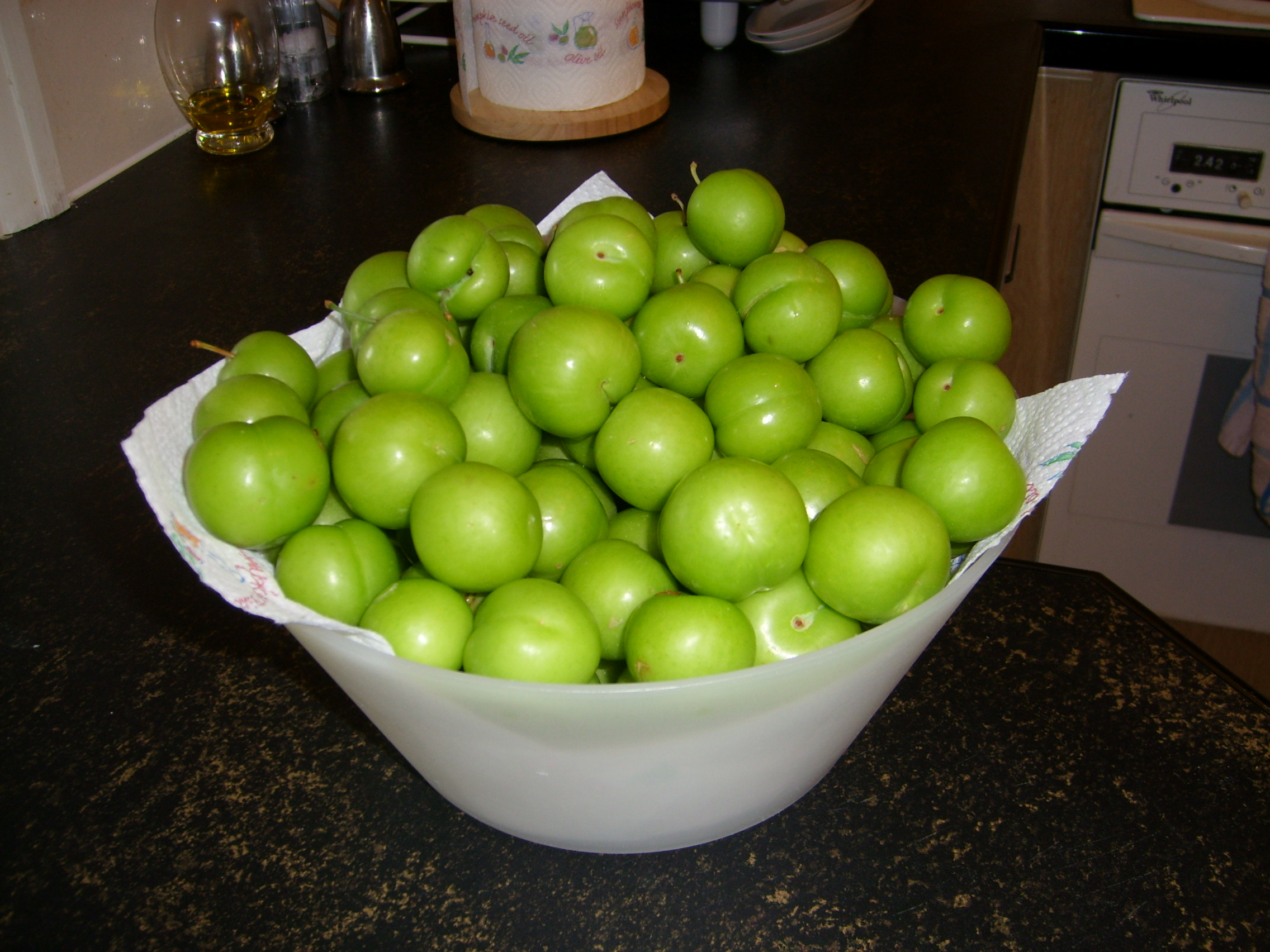
Ganerik, "Can Eric" or Ganarek.

The first settlers of Bdadoun came from the North Lebanon Maronite families as peasants. They found an uninviting land made of mostly rocky landscape strewn with oaks, wild figs, vines and some olive trees. Local dwellers built stone terraces planted fruit trees such as apricot, almonds, pear, apple, pomegranates, and plum trees. It is the latter, that Bdadoun is mostly known for plums (Turkish: Erik or Can Erik; Arabic: البَرقوق, romanized: al-barqūq) and holds an annual harvest festival in May. This plum is believed to be a close relative of the Greengage.

This is not to be mistaken with the Chinese Plum or Loquat which is also grown in Bdadoun and called Akkidinya or Akkadeneh. (Arabic: اككي دني. Turkish: yeni dunya, yedi dunya)

== Religion ==
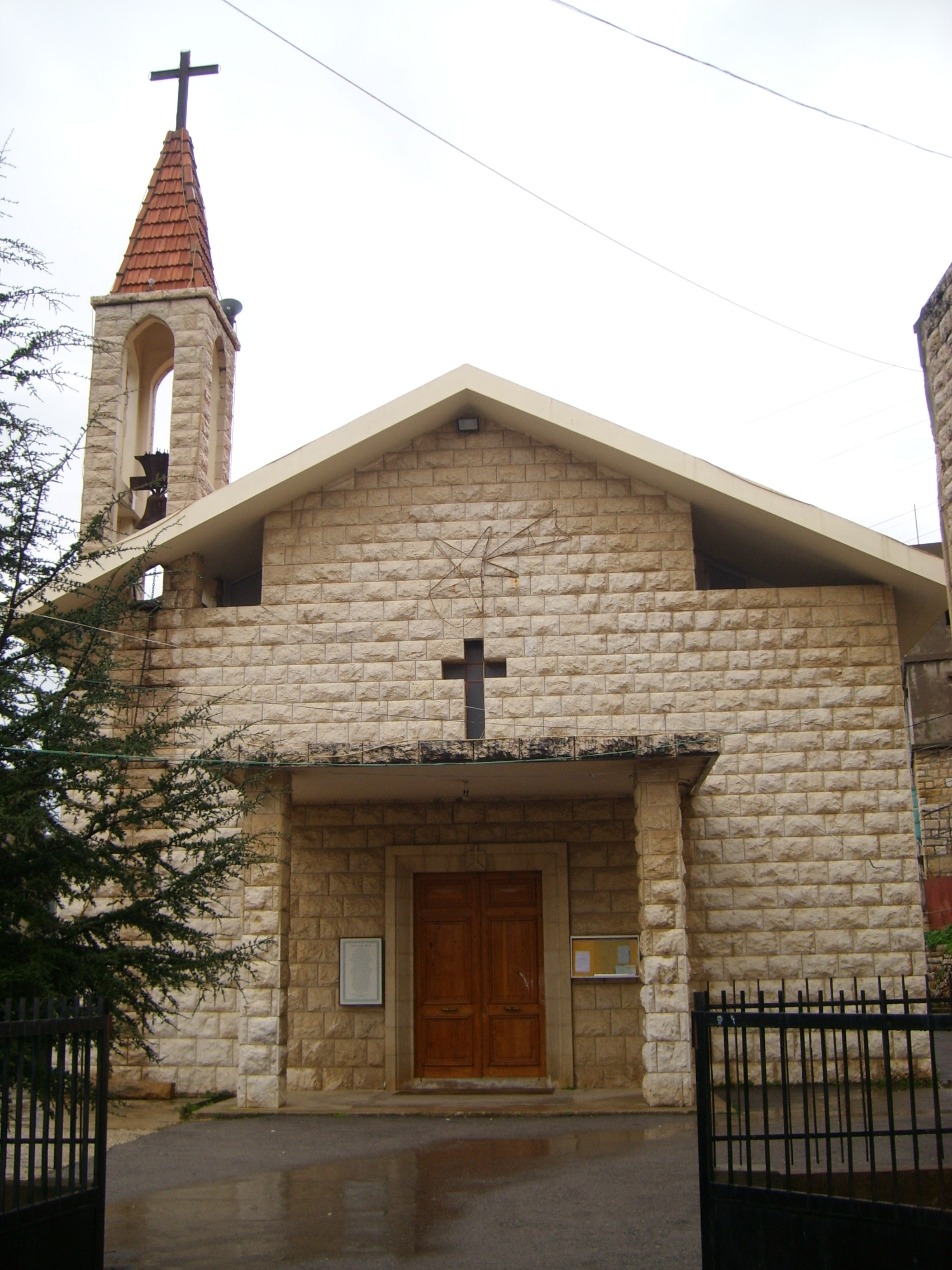
St Elias (Maar Elias el Hayy)

The Christian Maronite parish of Bdadoun is part of the Beirut diocese and has four churches:

- St. Georges (مار جريس). Built on 25 March 1899 with support of the Feghali family. Was renovated in 1988 by Mr John Ibrahim Hanna al-Feghaly.
- Notre Dame de Bdadoun (السيدة). Our Lady of Bdadoun church is known to have been built as a dwelling first in the 17th century. It has been rebuilt many times since, last time being in 1870 after the 1860s civil strife in Mount Lebanon.
- St. Antoine (مار انطونيوس). Current belief is that it was established as a church in 1903 and was supported by the Abi Roufayel family. The church steeple was erected in 1938.
- St. Elie (مار الياس الحي). First mass is known to have been held there on 26 December 1909 with support of the Howayek family. It was renovated in 1923.

== Educational institutions ==
- Bdadoun Public School, founded in 1921 by Selim Nouhra. It later became a public school.
- Ecole Saint Elie, founded in 1941 by Elias Tannous who donated the land to Saint Famille Maronite nuns.

== Geography ==
Bdadoun has an area of 143 hectares.

It is 352 meters to 550 meters above sea level and 15 km from Beirut.
Latitude 33.8100 Longitude 35.5611
Lat (DMS) 33° 48' 36N Long (DMS) 35° 33' 40E
Time zone (est) UTC+2(+3DT)

Bdadoun's bordering towns are Blaybel, Houmal, Wadi Chahrour, Aaytat, Bsous and Qmatiyeh. Kahale and Kfarshima are close by.

== Arts and Entertainment ==
- Folklore singer Zaghloul, known mostly for his Zajal style of songs recorded in "Haflit Bdadoun" made by al-Feghaly Family.
- Bdadoun Festival for the Plum Harvest (Mahrajaen el Ganaerik) made by al cha3li. A parade day followed by a night of singing and dancing. Major Lebanese folklore singers have been guests to this festival every year.

== Notable Persons ==
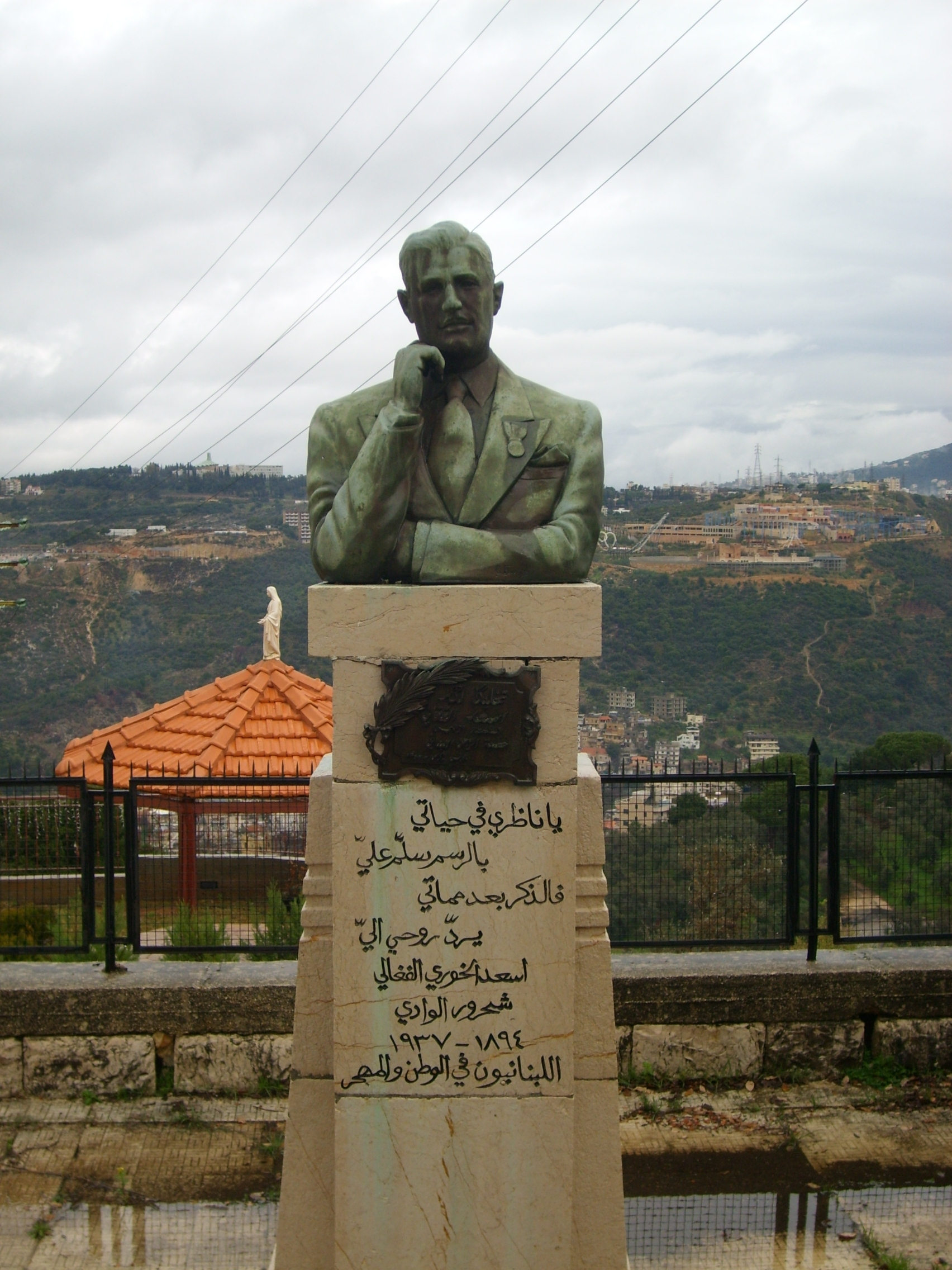
Asaad Feghali

- Janet Gerges Feghali, better known as Sabah, Lebanese singer and actress, nicknamed Shahruret-el Wadi
