= Charoun =

Charoun شارون
- Village
- Location within Lebanon
- Coordinates: 33°46′16″N 35°41′9″E
- Country: Lebanon
- Governorate: Mount Lebanon Governorate
- District: Aley District

Government
  - Mayor: Mhanna Banna

Area
  - Total: 10.5 km^{2} (4.1 sq mi)
- Elevation: 1,100 m (3,600 ft)
- Highest elevation: 1,477 m (4,846 ft)
- Lowest elevation: 750 m (2,460 ft)

Population
  - Total: 10,000
  - Density: 950/km^{2} (2,500/sq mi)
- Time zone: UTC+2 (EET)
  - Summer (DST): UTC+3 (EEST)
- Dialing code: +961

Charoun or Sharoun (Arabic: شارون, romanized: Shārūn), is a Lebanese village located in the Aley District. Charoun is 31 kilometers away from Beirut and neighbors the town Saoufar. Its name derives from the Aramaic languages meaning the agricultural hills. Charoun is from the Jurd region, with a 1350 m altitude. It accounts two schools, one public school and one private school. Charoun has two industries with 5 or more workers. Charoun is one of the biggest villages in the Aley District, (10.5 square km), and wholly Druze.

== Climate ==
The town receives heavy snow during the wintertime, which may reach a level higher than one metre high after particularly bad storms. Temperatures usually drop to less than zero during the months of December and January. Charoun is also known for its abundance in water like the Nahr Charoun and the historical Ain Bou-Freez, a 1030-year-old natural fountain. It also holds an important place in the Druze faith, as it contains two Druze maqams: Al maqam al shariff and the Sitt Sara maqam.
