= Ramlieh =

Ramlieh رملية
- Village
- Location within Lebanon
- Coordinates: 33°44′52″N 35°38′56″E
- Country: Lebanon
- Governorate: Mount Lebanon Governorate
- District: Aley District

Government
  - Mayor: Nabil Kamel Salman

Area
  - Total: 3.56 km^{2} (1.37 sq mi)
- Elevation: 650–950 m (2,130–3,120 ft)

Population (2008)
  - Total: 1,200
  - Density: 340/km^{2} (870/sq mi)
- Time zone: UTC+2 (EET)
  - Summer (DST): +3

Ramlieh (Arabic: رملية), also spelled Ramliye or Ramliyeh is a Lebanese village located about 34 km from the capital Beirut in the Aley District of Mount Lebanon.
