= Shemlan =

Shemlan شملان Chemlane
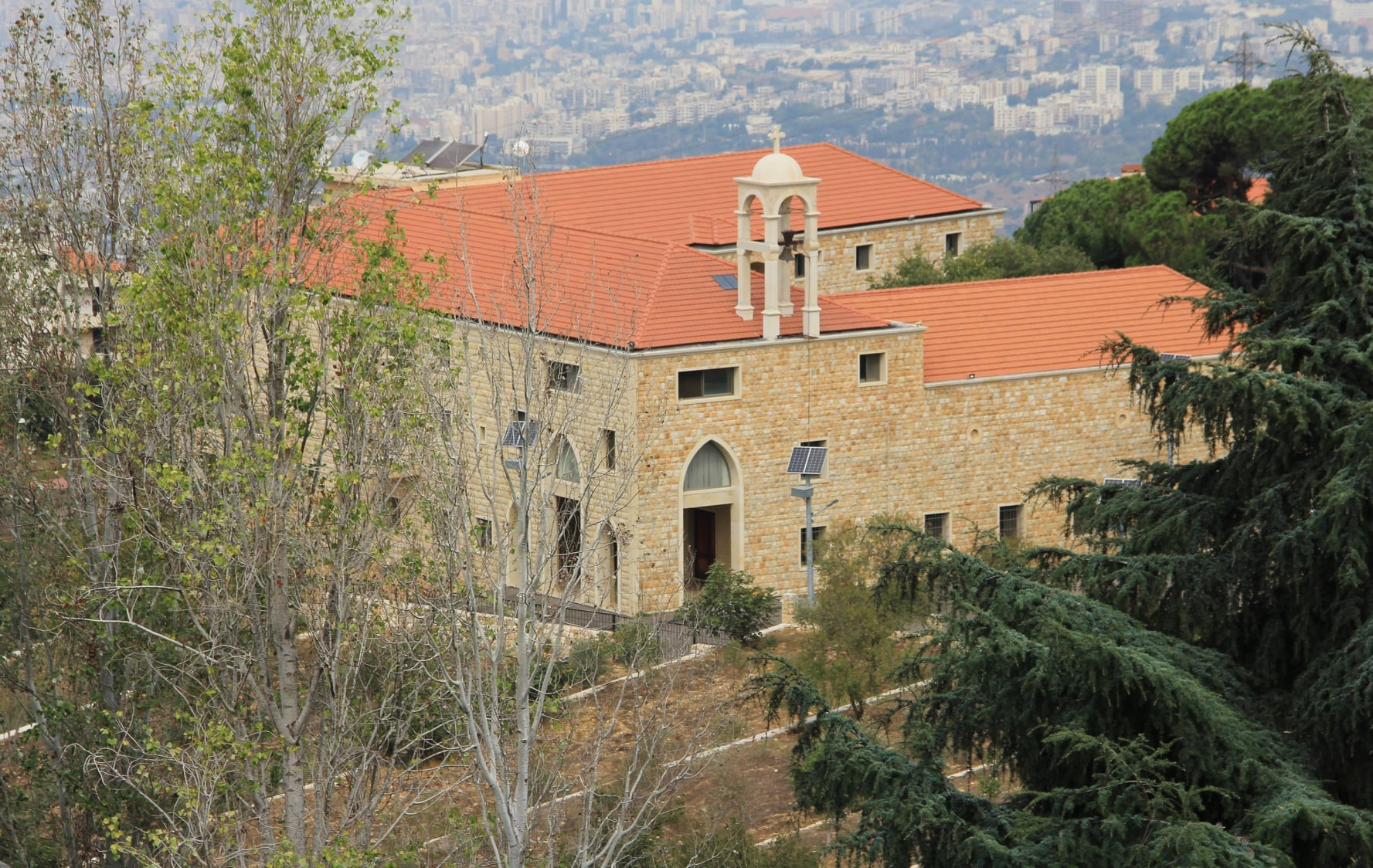
- Church in Shemlan

- Location in Lebanon
- Coordinates: 33°47′00″N 35°33′09″E
- Country: Lebanon
- Governorate: Mount Lebanon Governorate
- District: Aley District
- Time zone: UTC+2 (EET)
  - Summer (DST): +3
- Website: http://www.shimlan.gov.lb/en/index.asp

Shemlan (Arabic: شملان, romanized: Shimlān, also spelled Chemlane, Chimlane, Shimlan) is a village in the Aley District of the Mount Lebanon Governorate in Lebanon, located about 25 km from Beirut.

== History ==
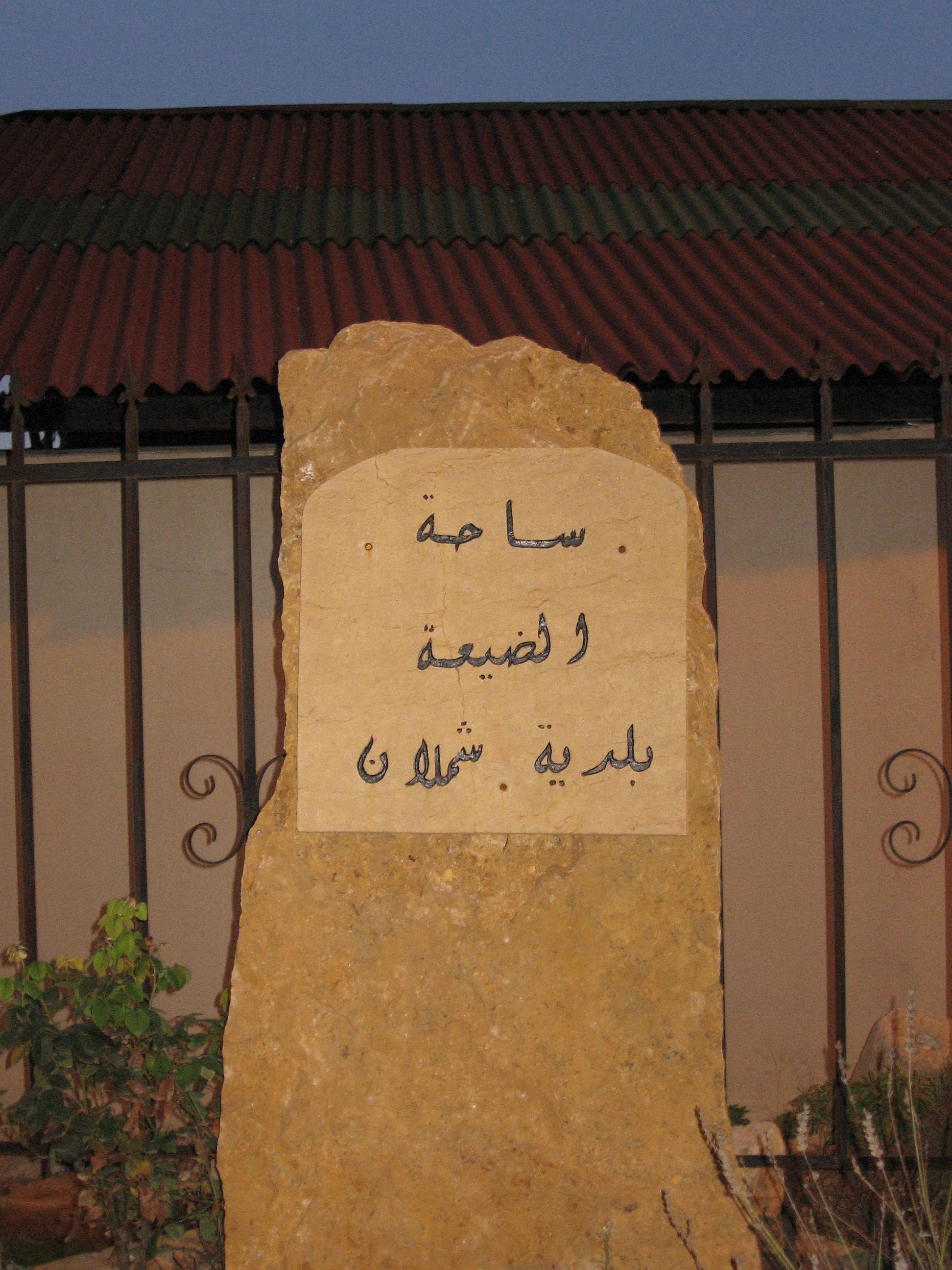
Memorial in Shemlan

Shemlan is first mentioned in chronicles as early as the 12th century. Under Ottoman rule, Shemlan and surrounding villages were controlled first by the Maan family and then by the Shihab dynasty. Power struggles led to the departure of some rival Druze, and their replacement by Christians from the North, which in 1828 prompted the establishment of a Maronite Christian monastery, now the village church. In 1838, Eli Smith noted the place, called Shumlan, located in El-Ghurb el-Fokany, upper el-Ghurb.

For more than a century, Shemlan consisted of five extended families: the Maronite Christian Jabbours, Hittis, Tabibs, and Farjallahs, plus the Druze Moukaddems, once lords and chief land-owners.

Due to its strategic location overlooking Beirut International Airport and the diverse political make-up of the area, Shemlan became a fierce battleground during the 1958 civil war and the Israeli invasion of Lebanon. Most inhabitants fled during the 1975 – 1990 civil war, many never to return.

In 1948, the British Government opened the Middle East Centre for Arab Studies (MECAS) in Shemlan. This school gained a reputation as being a "spy school" because of allegations, made by Lebanese politician Kamal Jumblatt, that many of its graduates worked for the C.I.A. or Britain's Foreign Office. However, the only proven case of a spy studying at MECAS was that of British/Soviet double agent George Blake, who was escorted from MECAS and formally arrested at Heathrow airport.

== Notable citizens ==
Philip Khuri Hitti (1886–1978), a renowned Lebanese American author and professor on the Middle East, was Shemlan's most famous resident.

== Bibliography ==
- Robinson, E.; Smith, E. (1841). Biblical Researches in Palestine, Mount Sinai and Arabia Petraea: A Journal of Travels in the year 1838. Vol. 3. Boston: Crocker & Brewster.
