= Bmahray =

Bmahray بمهريه
- Village
- Location within Lebanon
- Coordinates: 33°45′25″N 35°43′8″E
- Country: Lebanon
- Governorate: Mount Lebanon Governorate
- District: Aley District

Area
  - Total: 23.6 km^{2} (9.1 sq mi)
- Lowest elevation: 1,215 m (3,986 ft)
- Time zone: UTC+2 (EET)
  - Summer (DST): UTC+3 (EEST)
- Dialing code: +961

Bmahray (Arabic: بمهريه), is a village in the Aley District in Lebanon. It lies 41 km southeast of Beirut at an altitude of 1,215 m (3,986 ft) above sea level.

== Demographics ==
Bmahray's residents are Maronite, Druze, and Greek Catholic communities. The 2010 municipal elections census counted 1,018 registered voters, The village's religious buildings are Saint George Maronite church and a Druze Khalwa.

Bmahray's main families are:

- Bou Zakhem
- Bou Malhab / Bou Malham
- Al Abanni
- Saab
- Abou Chahine
- Abou Ghanem
- Moukamer
- Daou
- Jreidy
- Nakhle
- Rabah
- Malkoun

== Geography ==
Bmahray is located on the western face of Mount Lebanon. According to the national local development resource Center (Localiban), the village has a total municipal area of 23.6 square kilometres (9.11 sq mi).

== Archaeology ==
Bmahray contains the remains of Roman monuments and rock sarcophagi.

== Economics ==
Bmahray has no schools, no hospitals or medical institutions and no institutions counting more than 5 employees.

Before the Lebanese civil war, the main source of income for the villagers was horticulture, especially apples; the lack of water for irrigation failed attempts to revitalize this economic activity.

== Government and politics ==
Some residents are affiliated with March 14 Movement with others affiliated to the Free Patriotic Movement, and the Progressive Socialist Party. The mayor is Joseph Malkoun since 1998.

== Environment ==
Bmahray was one of the first villages to become part of the Shouf Cedar Biosphere Reserve. It has one million square meters of cedar trees, as well as at least 3,000,000 square meters of pine trees.
