= Kahale =

Kahale الكحالة Kehale
- Location in Lebanon
- Coordinates: 33°49′19″N 35°35′15″E
- Country: Lebanon
- Governorate: Mount Lebanon Governorate
- District: Aley District

Area
  - Total: 0.75 sq mi (1.94 km^{2})
- Elevation: 1,800 ft (550 m)

Population
  - Total: 13,000
- Time zone: UTC+2 (EST)
  - Summer (DST): +3

Kahale (Arabic: الكحالة, romanized: al-Kaḥāleh), is a mountain village in the district of Aley (Caza Aley), Lebanon, situated 13 km from Beirut. The population is estimated to be around 11,000 residents, with the majority being Maronite Catholic.

== Geography ==
Considering the locale and geography of the Kahale this name is suited well. A valley extends from the Sh'har west side of the Kahale into the Rjoum, eastern side of the Kahale.

== History ==
In 1838, Eli Smith noted the place, called el-Kahhaleh, located in El-Ghurb el-Fokany; Upper el-Ghurb.

== Religion ==
Kahale has a predominantly Maronite Catholic population.

The village has three churches:

- Mar Elias (مار الياس )
- Our Lady (السيدة)
- Mar Antonios (مار انطونيوس)

This in addition to Don Bosco monastery and school, and Saint Charbel Home for the elderly which is now closed.

== Bibliography ==
- Abi Khalil, Charbel. (1997). History of the Kahale. Beirut: The Arabic Press.
- Robinson, E.; Smith, E. (1841). Biblical Researches in Palestine, Mount Sinai and Arabia Petraea: A Journal of Travels in the year 1838. Vol. 3. Boston: Crocker & Brewster.
