= Aley District =

Coordinates: 33°48′23″N 35°36′02″E

Aalay District
- District
- عاليه
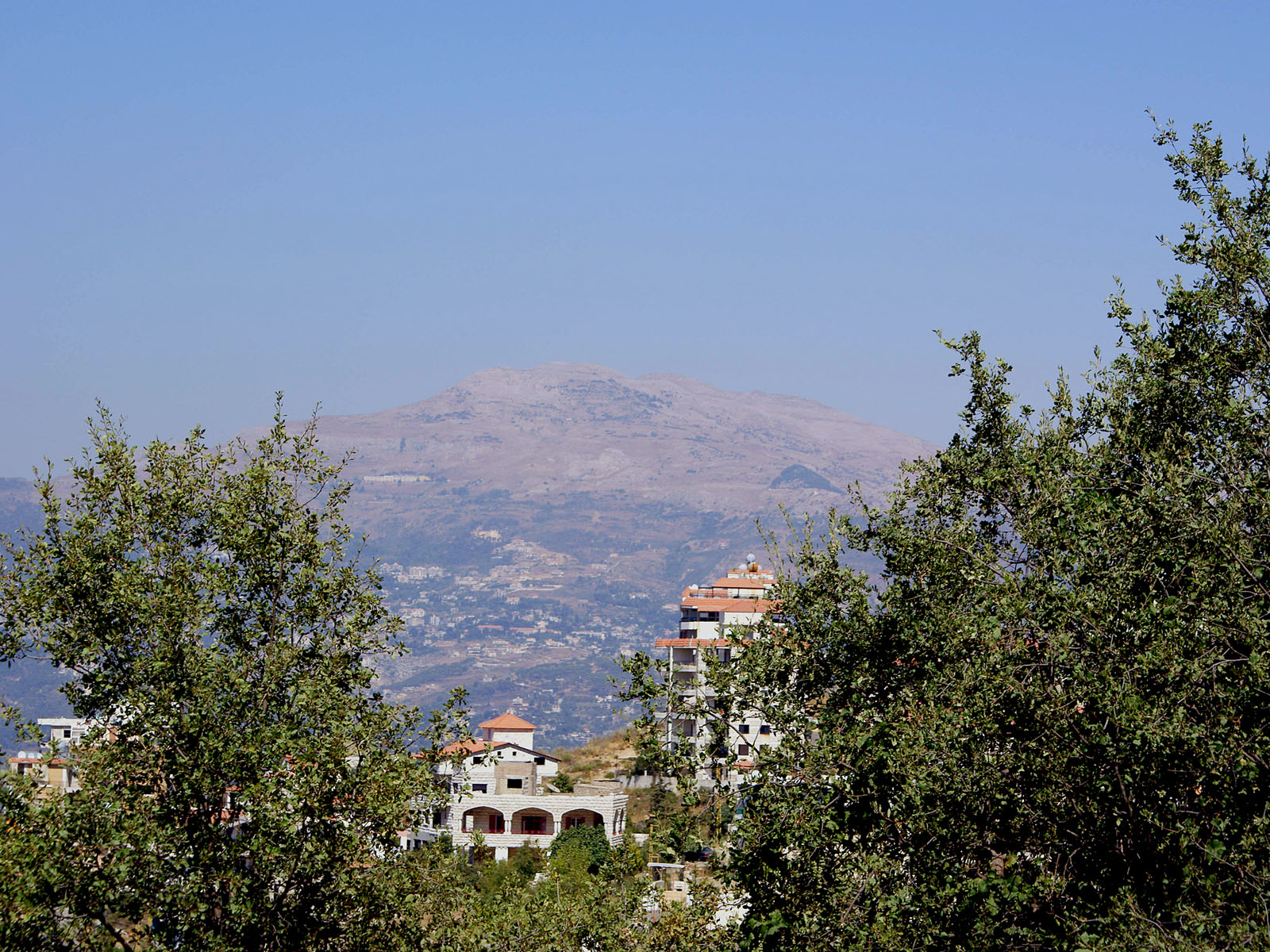
- Aley District

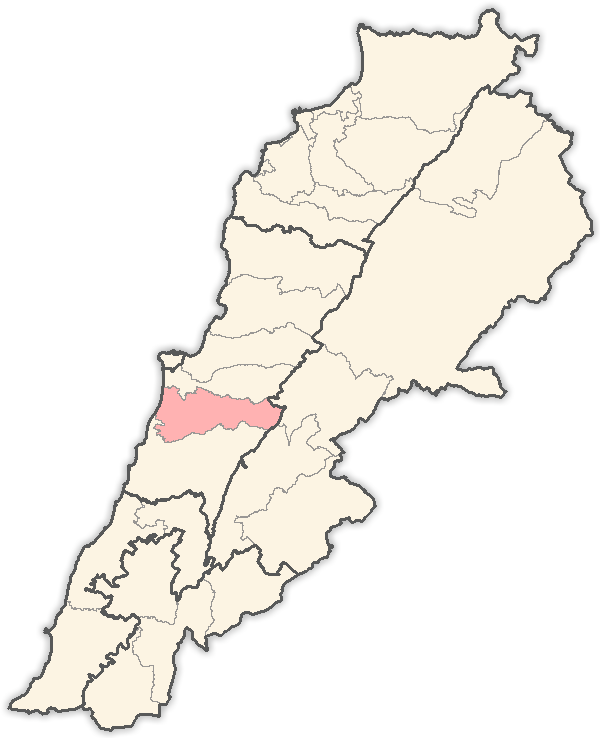
- Location in Lebanon
- Country: Lebanon
- Governorate: Mount Lebanon Governorate
- Capital: Aley

Area
  - Total: 102 sq mi (264 km^{2})

Population
  - Estimate (31 December 2017): 196,282
- Time zone: UTC+2 (EST)
  - Summer (DST): +3

Aley (Arabic: عاليه) is a district (qadaa) in Mount Lebanon, Lebanon, to the south-east of the Lebanon's capital Beirut. The capital is Aley which was known as the "bride of the summers" in the 1960 and 1970s, when the city was an attractive tourist location.

The district elects 5 members of parliament, of which 3 are Christians (1 Orthodox and 2 Maronite) and 2 are Druze. During the 1975-1990 Civil War in Lebanon, Aley witnessed several battles around its environs.

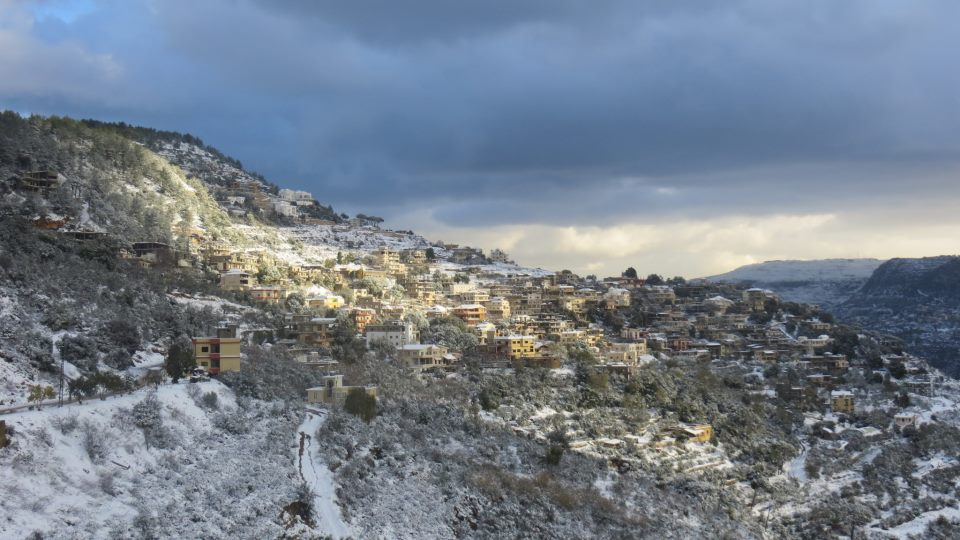
Al Bennay, Aley District

== Cities ==
- Aabey
- Aghmeed
- Ain Aanoub
- Ain Dara
- Ain Drafile
- Ain El Jdideh
- Ain El Halzoune
- Ain El Remmaneh
- Ain Ksour
- Ain Saideh
- Ain Sofar
- Ain Traz
- Ainab
- Aitate (Eitat)
- Aley
- Aramoun
- Baawerta
- Baissour
- Basateen
- Bdadoun
- Bedghane
- Bennieh
- Bhamdoun el Day'aa
- Bhamdoun el Mhatta
- Bhouara
- Bisrine (Bserrine)
- Bkhichtay (Bkhechtey)
- Bleibel
- Bmahray
- Bmakkine (Bemkine)
- Bouzridé
- Bsous
- Btallaoun
- Btater
- Bteezanieh
- Chanay
- Charoun
- Chartoun
- Choueifat Amroussyat
- Choueifat El Oumara
- Choueifat Qobbat
- Dakkoun
- Deir-Koubel
- Dfoun
- Douair El-Roummane
- El-Azouniyeh
- El-Bennayé
- El-Fsaïkine
- El-Ghaboun
- El-Kahalé
- El-Kamatiyeh
- El-Mansouriyeh
- El-Mechrefeh
- El-Mreijate
- El-Ramliyeh
- El-Rejmeh
- Habramoun
- Houmal
- Kahale
- Kaifun
- Kfar-Aammay
- Kfar Matta
- litige
- Maasraiti
- Majdel Baana-Sawfar
- Mansourieh - Ain el Marej
- Mazraet El-Nahr
- Mchakhté
- Mecherfeh
- Mejdlaya
- Qmatiye
- Rajmeh
- Ramlieh
- Ras el Jabal
- Rechmaya
- Remhala
- Roueissat El-Naaman
- Saoufar
- Sarahmoul
- Shemlan
- Silfaya
- Souk El Gharb
- Taazanieh

== Demographics ==
Like the neighboring Chouf District, the Aley district is also one of the most religiously diverse areas in Lebanon. The largest religious community in the Aley district is the Druze denomination, followed by the Maronite, and Greek Orthodox Christian denominations. There are also small communities of Shia Muslims.

According to registered voters in 2014:

Year	Christians					Muslims			Druze
Year	Total	Maronites	Greek Orthodox	Greek Catholics	Other Christians	Total	Shias	Sunnis	Druze
2014	41.32%	23.11%	11.79%	3.79%	2.63%	5.21%	3.25%	1.96%	53.05%
2018	41.11%	22.78%	11.61%	3.75%	2.97%	5.45%	3.38%	2.07%	53.44%
2022	41.51%	23.74%	12.13%	3.48%	2.16%	5.43%	3.50%	1.93%	53.06%
2026	39.41%	17.87%	12.19%	2.88%	1.47%	4.96%	3.47%	1.49%	55.63%

Number of registered voters (21+ years old) over the years.

Years	Women	Men	Total	Growth (%)
2009	59,460	56,622	116,182	—N/a
2010	60,426 ▲	57,502 ▲	117,928 ▲	+1.48% ▲
2011	60,650 ▲	57,977 ▲	118,627 ▲	+0.59% ▼
2012	61,114 ▲	58,369 ▲	119,483 ▲	+0.72% ▲
2013	62,011 ▲	59,213 ▲	121,224 ▲	+1.44% ▲
2014	62,546 ▲	59,821 ▲	122,367 ▲	+0.93% ▼
2015	63,185 ▲	60,448 ▲	123,633 ▲	+1.02% ▲
2016	63,554 ▲	61,090 ▲	124,644 ▲	+0.81% ▼
2017	64,159 ▲	61,640 ▲	125,799 ▲	+0.92% ▲
2018	65,044 ▲	62,337 ▲	127,381 ▲	+1.24% ▲
2019	65,917 ▲	62,739 ▲	128,656 ▲	+0.99% ▼
2020	66,891 ▲	63,631 ▲	130,522 ▲	+1.43% ▲
2021	67,697 ▲	64,422 ▲	132,139 ▲	+1.22% ▼
2022	68,601 ▲	65,338 ▲	133,939 ▲	+1.34% ▲
2023	69,092 ▲	65,746 ▲	134,838 ▲	+0.67% ▼
2024	69,802 ▲	66,398 ▲	136,200 ▲	+1.00% ▲
2025	70,350 ▲	66,936 ▲	137,286 ▲	+0.79% ▼
2026	—N/a	—N/a	136,315 ▼	-0.71% ▼
Source: DGCS
