= Fortress of Niha =

Medieval fortress in Lebanon

Coordinates: 33.57978318°N 35.60890259°E

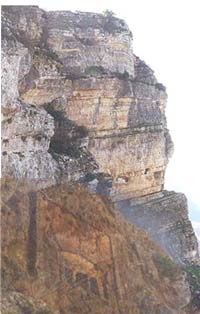

General information
- Type: Fort
- Location: Niha Chouf, Lebanon
- Completed: ~975 AD

The Fortress of Niha (also called Cave of Tyron in Frankish sources and Chquif Tayroun in Arabic sources) is an ancient fortress in Lebanon, first mentioned in historical records in 975 AD. It is located in the municipality of Niha Chouf in Lebanon, and is today visited as cultural heritage in the Shouf Cedar Nature Reserve.

Carved into the rock of a cliff overlooking the Bisri and 'Aray valley, the Fortress of Niha overlooks the road between Sidon and the Beqaa Valley. It was first mentioned in 975 AD. Some time between 1134 and 1165, it was refortified by the Crusaders. It was held intermittently by the lords of Sidon until 1257, when it was granted to the Teutonic Knights. Despite its remoteness, the fortress was significant enough to be mentioned in the French king Louis IX's ransom agreement with the Egyptians in 1250, as one of the strongpoints the Franks were permitted to retain. In 1260, it was captured and destroyed by the Muslims. In 1270, the Mamluk leader Baibars ordered it rebuilt. In 1585, the Emir Qorqomaz Maan probably took refuge in it briefly before his death. It is alleged that the Emir Fakhr-al-Din II also found refuge there before he was executed by the Pasha of Damascus in 1635, but it might more probably have been his father Emir Korkomaz, in 1584.

Formed from a cave over a hundred metres deep, the fortress features chambers and rooms which were excavated in order to shelter soldiers and as depots for domestic work. Water was provided by a complex canal system from a spring a mile away. The access is along a precipitous path, with one section requiring one to crawl along a ledge above a 300m drop.

== See also ==
- Lordship of the Schuf
- List of Crusader castles
