= Fakhr al-Din II =

Druze emir of Mount Lebanon (6 August 1572–13 April 1635)

- فَخْرُ ٱلدِّينِ ٱلثَّانِي
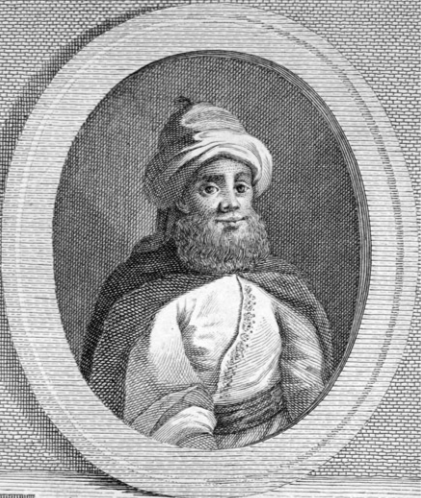
- Engraving of a portrait of Fakhr al-Din by Giovanni Mariti, 1787 (Note: The engraving was the frontispiece of Giovanni Mariti's Istoria de Faccardino, published in Tuscany in 1787. According to the art historian Hafez Chehab, "it is generally believed" that the engraving was a copy of a painted portrait of Fakhr al-Din originally in the possession of Ferdinand II, Grand Duke of Tuscany. A request to borrow the original portrait was made in 1659 by Abu Nawfal al-Khazen on behalf of Fakhr al-Din's grandnephews Ahmad and Qurqumaz, but there is no indication that the Grand Duke responded, and the original's whereabouts are unknown.)

Sanjak-bey of Sidon-Beirut
- In office December 1592 – 1606
- Monarchs: Murad III (r. 1574–1595); Mehmed III (r. 1595–1603)
- Preceded by: Unknown
- Succeeded by: Ali Ma'n

Sanjak-bey of Safed
- In office July 1602 – September 1613
- Monarchs: Mehmed III (r. 1595–1603); Ahmed I (r. 1603–1617)
- Preceded by: Unknown
- Succeeded by: Muhammad Agha

Zabit (Nahiya governor) of Baalbek
- In office 1625–unknown
- Monarch: Murad IV (r. 1623–1640)
- Preceded by: Yunus al-Harfush

Zabit of Tripoli Eyalet nahiyas (Note: The nahiyas (subdistricts) of Tripoli Eyalet Fakhr al-Din was appointed over were Byblos, Bsharri, Batroun, Dinniyeh, Arqa, Akkar, Hisn al-Akrad, Safita and Jableh.)
- In office 1632–1633
- Monarch: Murad IV

Personal details
- Born: 6 August 1572 Baakleen
- Died: 13 April 1635 (aged 63) Constantinople, Ottoman Empire
- Spouses: Daughter of Jamal al-Din Arslan (m. 1590): Daughter of a Qaysi Druze chieftain; Alwa bint Ali Sayfa (m. 1603): Khasikiya bint Zafir
- Relations: Ma'n dynasty (paternal clan); Tanukh dynasty (maternal clan); Yunus Ma'n (brother)
- Children: Ali; Mansur; Hasan; Husayn; Haydar; Bulak; Sitt al-Nasr (daughter); Fakhira (daughter)
- Parents: Qurqumaz ibn Yunus Ma'n (father); Sitt Nasab (mother)
- Occupation: Multazim of the following nahiyas: List: Sidon and Beirut (1589–1611, 1628–1631); Chouf (1591–1600, 1628–1631); Acre (1593–1597, 1602–1612, 1628–1631); Southern Beqaa Valley (1593–1597); Shaqif and Bishara (1593–1598); Jurd and Matn (1594–1598, 1610, 1628–1631); Safed and Tiberias (1602–1612, 1628–1631); Hula and Shara (1603, 1606); Bsharri, Byblos, Batroun, Dinniyeh (1623–1631); Arqa, Akkar (1625–1631); Hisn al-Akrad and Safita (1626–1631); Jableh and Latakia (1628–1632)

Fakhr al-Din Ma'n (Arabic: فَخْر ٱلدِّين مَعْن, romanized: Fakhr al-Dīn Maʿn; 6 August 1572 – 13 April 1635), commonly known as Fakhr al-Din II or Fakhreddine II (Arabic: فخر الدين الثاني, romanized: Fakhr al-Dīn al-Thānī), (Note: He is commonly known as 'Fakhr al-Din II' to distinguish him from his direct, paternal ancestor, Fakhr al-Din I, who was erroneously identified by 19th-century local chroniclers and 20th-century historians as the grandfather of Fakhr al-Din II. Modern research has indicated that Fakhr al-Din I was an earlier ancestor, whose actual name was Fakhr al-Din Uthman ibn al-Hajj Yunus, the first member of the Ma'n dynasty whose historicity is proven, according to the historian Kamal Salibi.) was the paramount Druze emir of Mount Lebanon from the Ma'n dynasty, an Ottoman governor of Sidon-Beirut and Safed, and ruler over much of the Levant from the 1620s to 1633. For uniting modern Lebanon's constituent parts and communities, especially the Druze and the Maronites, under a single authority for the first time in history, he is generally regarded as the country's founder. Although he ruled in the name of the Ottomans, he acted with considerable autonomy and developed close ties with European powers in defiance of the Ottoman imperial government.

Fakhr al-Din succeeded his father as the emir of the Chouf mountains in 1591. He was appointed over the sanjaks (districts) of Sidon-Beirut in 1593 and Safed in 1602. Despite joining the rebellion of Ali Janbulad in 1606, Fakhr al-Din remained in his post and the Ottomans recognized his takeover of the Keserwan mountains from his rival Yusuf Sayfa. Seven years later, an imperial campaign was launched against him for allying with Tuscany and garrisoning the strategic fortresses of Shaqif Arnun and Subayba. He escaped and became an exile in Tuscany and Sicily. Upon his return in 1618, he resumed control of his former domains and within three years took over predominantly Maronite northern Mount Lebanon.

After Fakhr al-Din routed the governor of Damascus at the Battle of Anjar in 1623, he extended his control to the Beqaa Valley, the stronghold of his rivals, the Harfush dynasty. Fakhr al-Din proceeded to capture fortresses across central Syria, gained practical control of Tripoli and its eyalet, and acquired tax farms as far north as Latakia. Although he frequently attained government favor by timely forwarding of tax revenue, bribing officials, and using opportunities of mutual interest to eliminate local rivals, his outsized power and autonomy were considered a rebellion by the imperial government. A near-contemporary historian remarked that "the only thing left for him to do was to claim the Sultanate". He surrendered to the Ottomans during a siege of his Chouf hideout in 1633 and was executed in Constantinople two years later. In 1697 Fakhr al-Din's grandnephew was awarded a tax farm spanning southern Mount Lebanon. It was gradually expanded by the Ma'ns' marital relatives, the Shihabs, in 1711, and was a precursor to the Lebanese Republic.

According to the historian Kamal Salibi, Fakhr al-Din "combined military skill and eminent qualities of leadership with a keen business acumen and unusual powers of observation". During a period when the empire was in a long economic crisis, Fakhr al-Din's territories thrived, and Sidon in particular attained political significance for the first time in its modern history. He protected, promoted, and helped modernize commercial agriculture in his domains, inaugurating the lucrative silk trade of Mount Lebanon. By opening his port towns for European commerce, he facilitated the most significant European political and economic penetration of the Levantine coast since the 13th century. Fakhr al-Din's wealth, derived mainly from his tax farms, but also from extortion and counterfeiting, enabled him to invest in the fortifications and infrastructure needed to foster stability, order, and economic growth.

His building works included palatial government houses in Sidon, Beirut and his Chouf stronghold of Deir al-Qamar, caravanserais, bathhouses, mills, and bridges, some of which remain extant. Tax farming financed his army of sekban mercenaries, which after 1623 mostly replaced the local peasant levies on which he previously depended. Christians prospered and played key roles under his rule, with his main enduring legacy being the symbiotic relationship he set in motion between Maronites and Druze, which proved foundational for the creation of a Lebanese entity.

== Origins and early life ==
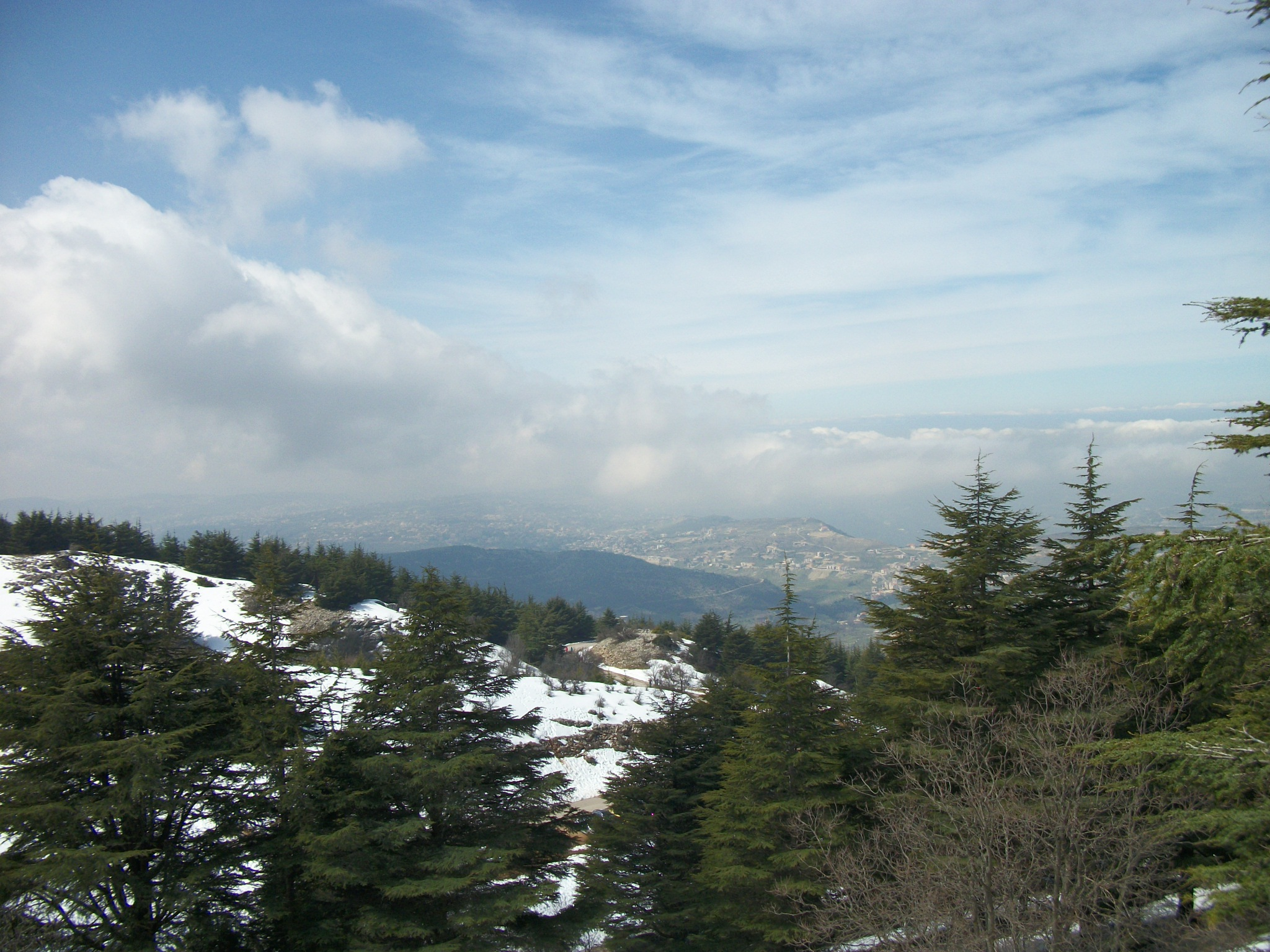
The mountains of the Chouf (pictured in 2019), the traditional territory of Fakhr al-Din's family, the Ma'n dynasty

Fakhr al-Din was born c. 1572, the eldest of at least two sons of Qurqumaz ibn Yunus, the other son being Yunus. They belonged to the Ma'n dynasty, a Druze family of Arab stock established in the Chouf area of southern Mount Lebanon from before the Ottoman conquest of the Levant in 1516; traditional accounts date their arrival in the Chouf to 1120. The Chouf was administratively divided into a number of nahiyas (subdistricts). They were part of the Sidon Sanjak, a district of Damascus Eyalet. The Chouf, together with the neighboring mountainous nahiyas of the Gharb, the Jurd and the Matn, all south or east of Beirut, were commonly referred to in contemporary sources as "the Druze Mountain" due to their predominantly Druze population.

Like other Ma'nids before him, Qurqumaz was a muqaddam, a local rural chieftain in charge of a small area. He was also a multazim—a holder of a limited-term tax farm known as an iltizam—over all or part of the Chouf. He was referred to as 'emir' by local chroniclers, but the title reflected the traditional prominence of his family in the community and was not an official rank. (Note: The Ma'nid chiefs of the late Mamluk period were referred to as emirs by contemporary sources, suggesting that the chiefs held a military commission in their home region of the Chouf in southern Mount Lebanon. Although his paramount leadership was not recognized by all of the Druze of Mount Lebanon, Fakhr al-Din's father Qurqumaz was referred to as the 'emir of the Druzes' by the 17th-century Damascene historians al-Burini, al-Ghazzi and al-Muhibbi, while the 17th-century Maronite patriarch and historian Istifan al-Duwayhi referred to him simply as 'the emir'.) Fakhr al-Din's mother, Sitt Nasab, belonged to the Tanukh, a princely Druze family established in the Gharb from at least the 12th century. In the words of the historian Kamal Salibi, Fakhr al-Din's paternal ancestors "were the traditional chieftains of the hardy Druzes" of the Chouf, and his maternal kinsmen "were well acquainted with commercial enterprise" in Beirut (see family tree below).

The Druze were officially considered Muslims by the Ottomans for taxation purposes, though they were not viewed as genuine Muslims by the authorities. Members of the community had to pretend to be of the Sunni Muslim creed to attain any official post, were occasionally forced to pay the poll tax known as jizya which was reserved for Christians and Jews, and were the target of condemnatory treatises and fatwas (religious edicts). In countering their incorporation into the Ottoman administrative and fiscal system, the Druze benefited from their rugged terrain and stockpiles of muskets, making it difficult to impose Ottoman authority in the Druze Mountain. Ottoman efforts to tax and disarm the Druze manifested in a series of punitive expeditions between 1523 and 1585. During the summer 1585 expedition, hundreds of Druze elders were slain by the vizier Ibrahim Pasha and the Bedouin chief Mansur ibn Furaykh of the Beqaa Valley, and thousands of muskets were confiscated. Qurqumaz refused to surrender and died in hiding shortly after the expedition.

The period between Qurqumaz's death and Fakhr al-Din's emergence in local politics is obscure. According to the historian William Harris, the chiefs of the Druze, "long disobedient and fractious, again became ungovernable" after Qurqumaz's death. The 17th-century historian and Maronite patriarch Istifan al-Duwayhi, who was an associate of the Ma'n, holds that Fakhr al-Din and Yunus were afterward taken in by their maternal uncle Sayf al-Din, the Tanukhid chief of Abeih in the Gharb, for about six years. (Note: While Duwayhi held that the two brothers remained in the Chouf under Sayf al-Din's protection, Salibi considered it more likely that they were hosted in the Gharb. In the interim period Salibi presumed that the Chouf was dominated by the Alam al-Din family. A tradition originated by the Khazen family holds that Fakhr al-Din and his brother were safeguarded by Ibrahim al-Khazen in Ballouneh in the Keserwan area for six years after which the brothers drove out Sayf al-Din from the Chouf with the help of the Druze chief Abu Harmush of Samqaniyeh. The researcher Alexander Hourani notes that Duwayhi's version is more credible, but allows the possibility that Fakhr al-Din was with the Khazens in the Keserwan at the time of his father's death as al-Burini places Qurqumaz in the Keserwan in July 1586.)

=== Appearance and personality ===
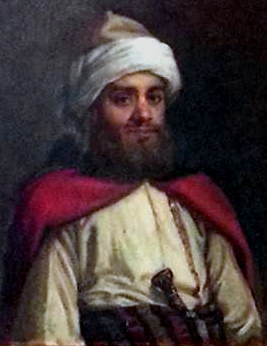
A modern, artistic representation of Fakhr al-Din in the Beiteddine Palace.

Most contemporary descriptions of Fakhr al-Din's appearance note his small stature. He had an olive complexion, a ruddy face, and black eyes, described as "brilliant" by Eugène Roger, a Nazareth-based Franciscan who served as Fakhr al-Din's physician in 1632–1633. His practical court historian, Ahmad al-Khalidi, (Note: Ahmad al-Khalidi's work, which chronicles Fakhr al-Din's life and career from 1612 until 1624, is the most detailed contemporary source of information about Fakhr al-Din.) referred to him as latif al-hamah, roughly translating as 'one with a kind face'. The French consul in Sidon and traveler Chevalier d'Arvieux commented on his appearance:

Fakhr al-Din was of mediocre height, brown in face; he had a colored complexion, large eyes full of fire, an aquiline nose, a small mouth, white teeth, a beautiful face, a chestnut-blond beard, a very majestic air, of wit infinitely male and a harmonious voice. (Note: Translated from the original French: "Fekher-din étoit de taille médiocre, brun de visage; il avoit le teint coloré, les yeux grands et plains de feu, le nez aquilin, le bouche petit, les dents blanches, un beau tour de visage, la barbe d'un blond châtin, l'air grand et majestueux, de l'esprit infiniment, la voix mâle et harmonieuse.")

According to Harris, the English traveler George Sandys, a contemporary of Fakhr al-Din, offered the "best description" of his personality, calling him "great in courage and achievements ... subtle as a fox, and a not a little inclining to the Tyrant [Ottoman sultan]". Sandys further noted that he was "never known to pray, nor ever seen in a mosque" and only made major decisions after consulting his mother. Roger remarked that he had "invincible courage" and was "learned in astrology and physiognomy".

== Rise ==
=== Governor of Sidon-Beirut and Safed ===
Around 1590 Fakhr al-Din succeeded his father as the muqaddam of all or part of the Chouf. Tax records indicate that he had gained the iltizam of the Sidon and Beirut nahiyas and the port of Beirut from 14 July 1589. Unlike his Ma'nid predecessors, he cooperated with the Ottomans who, though able to suppress Mount Lebanon's local chiefs with massive force, were unable to pacify the region in the long term without local support. When the veteran general Murad Pasha was appointed beylerbey (provincial governor) of Damascus, Fakhr al-Din hosted and gave him expensive gifts upon his arrival at Sidon in September 1593. He appointed him the sanjak-bey (district governor), (Note: This Turkish title was called amir liwa in Arabic sources.) of Sidon-Beirut in December. While his ancestors were locally referred to as emirs, Fakhr al-Din had attained the official rank of emir or its Turkish equivalent, bey.

The Ottomans' preoccupation with the wars against Safavid Iran‍—‌between 1578 and 1590 and again between 1603 and 1618‍—‌and the war with Habsburg Austria afforded Fakhr al-Din the space to consolidate and expand his semi-autonomous power. Between 1591 and 1594 government records indicate that Fakhr al-Din's tax farms grew to span the Chouf, Matn, Jurd, the southern Beqaa Valley, the Shaqif and Tibnin nahiyas in Jabal Amil—in present-day South Lebanon—as well as the salt profits from the ports of Acre, Sidon, and Beirut. Most of his tax farms were renewed by the Ottoman imperial government between 1596 and 1598.

Coinciding interests between Fakhr al-Din and the Ottomans frequently recurred in his career through which he advanced against his local rivals. In 1594 or 1595 Murad Pasha executed Ibn Furaykh and ordered Fakhr al-Din to kill Ibn Furaykh's son Qurqumaz. The sources attribute the measures to Fakhr al-Din's influence over Murad Pasha, though his role was exaggerated according to the historian Abdul-Rahim Abu-Husayn. Nonetheless, the elimination of the Furaykhs, known for their exactions on the local population and harassment of the Druze, had been a mutual interest of Fakhr al-Din and the government.

Their interests coincided again in 1598 when Fakhr al-Din was commissioned by the beylerbey of Damascus, Seyyed Mehmed Pasha, to drive out Yusuf Sayfa Pasha, the beylerbey of Tripoli and local chief of Akkar, from the nahiyas of Beirut and the Keserwan. Fakhr al-Din had been wary of Yusuf's growing proximity to his domains, while Damascus, to which Beirut and the Keserwan administratively belonged, opposed Tripoli's encroachment into its jurisdiction. Fakhr al-Din routed Yusuf's forces at the Nahr al-Kalb river and took control of the two nahiyas for a year before returning them to Yusuf in return for payment. The battle inaugurated a rivalry between Fakhr al-Din and the Sayfas, which lasted for the remainder of his career.

In July 1602, after his patron Murad Pasha became a vizier in Constantinople, Fakhr al-Din was appointed the sanjak-bey of Safed. Shortly before, he had gained the iltizam of the Acre, Tiberias and Safed nahiyas. With the Druze of Sidon-Beirut and Safed under his authority, he effectively became their paramount chief. Although the Druze were often in conflict with the Ottomans, in principle the community was loyal to the ruling Sunni Muslim states, in contrast with the Shia Muslims, who formed a large component of the population of the Safed sanjak. Fakhr al-Din, his military talents proven, may have been appointed to the post to leverage his Druze power base against the Shia.

He cultivated close ties with Safed's Sunni religious scholarly class, known as the ulema. Among them was Khalidi, who was mufti of the city's Hanafis, the madhab‍—‌Islamic school of law‍—‌favored by the Ottoman state. Foreseeing that he would benefit from Khalidi's close ties to the Damascene authorities and ulema, Fakhr al-Din entered him into his service. Fakhr al-Din was careful to present himself as a Sunni to the Ottoman government.

=== Janbulad rebellion and aftermath ===
In 1606 Fakhr al-Din made common cause with the Kurdish rebel Ali Janbulad of Aleppo against Yusuf; the latter had been invested as commander-in-chief of the Ottoman armies in the Levant to suppress Janbulad. Fakhr al-Din, "who no doubt shared Canpolad's [Janbulad's] thirst for greater regional autonomy", according to the historian Stefan Winter, had ignored government orders to join Yusuf's army. Yusuf's rout by Janbulad and his sekbans (Note: Sekbans (lit. 'dog-keepers'; third-tier division of the janissaries corps) were first brought to the Levant by the sanjak-bey of Nablus, a certain Turk named Abu Sayfayn (d. 1588), to enforce his rule. About 30,000 sekbans were outlawed by Grand Vizier Sinan Pasha for refusing to engage in the Battle of Keresztes in modern Hungary in 1596, leaving them to join the Anatolian Celali rebellions and become a major source of instability in the Levant. They became a key part of the private armies of Levantine local chieftains in the early 17th century.) at Hama demonstrated the weakness of the government's troops in the Levant; after the battle, Fakhr al-Din united forces with the Kurdish rebel near Hermel. According to Khalidi, Fakhr al-Din's motive was to defend his territory from Yusuf, though Abu-Husayn maintains that he also aimed to take over Beirut and Keserwan, both held by Yusuf.

The rebel allies advanced through the Beqaa Valley toward Damascus where Yusuf was headquartered. Fakhr al-Din and Janbulad gathered the Shihabs of Wadi al-Taym, old allies of the Ma'ns, and besieged Damascus. They defeated Yusuf's troops outside the city and sacked its suburbs for three days, demanding Yusuf's surrender. Yusuf escaped after bribing the city's officials, and Fakhr al-Din and Janbulad withdrew after the officials bribed them with Yusuf's money to lift the siege. Janbulad pursued Yusuf to his redoubt at the Krak des Chevaliers castle where the latter sued for peace, but Fakhr al-Din did not join him. In the course of the fighting, Fakhr al-Din took over the Keserwan.

Murad Pasha, who had become grand vizier in 1606, moved against Janbulad in late 1607 and demanded that Fakhr al-Din join his imperial forces at Payas off the Gulf of Alexandretta. The contemporary Damascene historian al-Burini reported that Fakhr al-Din ignored the summons, waiting for the outcome of the war to decide his position. When Janbulad was defeated, Fakhr al-Din immediately dispatched three hundred men under his son Ali with considerable gifts in the form of 150,000 piasters and 150,000 piasters' worth in silk to appease Murad Pasha in Aleppo. The high amount was a testament to the Ma'ns' wealth and demonstrated why Murad Pasha was invested in their alliance, according to the historian Alessandro Ossaretti. The Grand Vizier had been petitioned by a Damascene delegation to punish Fakhr al-Din for joining Janbulad and damaging their city, but Murad Pasha left him alone, promising the Damascenes he would deal with Fakhr al-Din at a later time. The Aleppine historian al-Urdi (d. 1660) and Sandys attributed Murad Pasha's favorable treatment of Fakhr al-Din in the aftermath of Janbulad's defeat to Fakhr al-Din's large bribes and their cordial ties during Murad Pasha's governorship of Damascus.

Fakhr al-Din was kept as sanjak-bey of Safed, his son Ali was appointed to Sidon-Beirut, and their control of the Keserwan was recognized by the Ottoman imperial government. In early 1610 Fakhr al-Din was instructed by Murad Pasha to assist the new beylerbey of Tripoli, Husayn Pasha al-Jalali, with the collection of the eyalet's taxes amid the interference of Yusuf, who had been dismissed from his post but still held practical control of Tripoli's countryside.

== First conflict with the Ottoman imperial government ==
=== Alliance with Tuscany ===
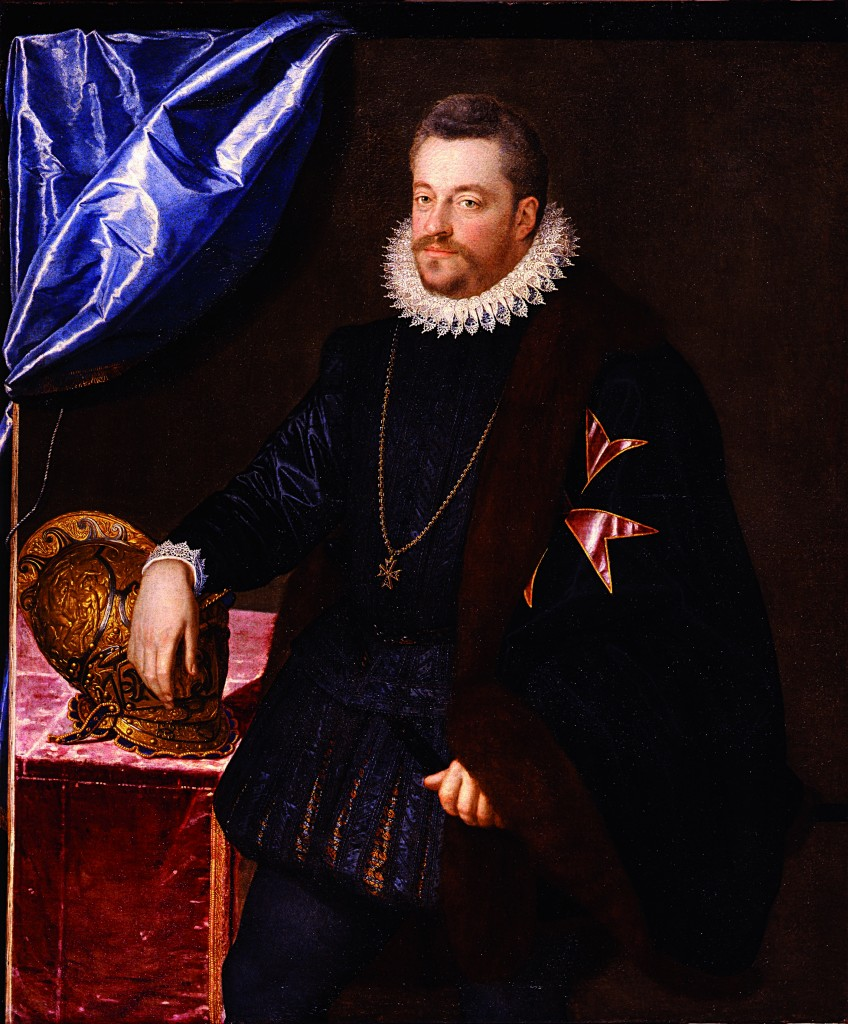
Fakhr al-Din and the Grand Duke of Tuscany, Ferdinand I (pictured), entered a treaty in 1608 stipulating Ma'nid support for a future crusade in the Holy Land in return for military aid and Maronite support for Fakhr al-Din.

Toward the close of the 16th century, the Medici grand dukes of Tuscany had become increasingly active in the eastern Mediterranean, pushed for a new crusade in the Holy Land, and began patronizing the Maronite Christians of Mount Lebanon. Fakhr al-Din rebuffed two Tuscan requests to meet between 1599 and 1602, while the Grand Duke Ferdinand I did not act upon his adviser's suggestion in 1605 to communicate with Fakhr al-Din about a new crusade and trade relations with Beirut. The Tuscans focused instead on Janbulad, with whom they signed a treaty stipulating his assistance in a new crusade and special interests for the Tuscans in the Levantine ports months before Janbulad was defeated.

After Janbulad's defeat, the Tuscans shifted focus to Fakhr al-Din, sending him an arms shipment originally bound for Janbulad. In 1608 they promised him sanctuary in Tuscany if he backed a future crusade. Fakhr al-Din and Tuscany forged a treaty that year. It stipulated military aid and support from the Maronite clergy to Fakhr al-Din against the Sayfas, who controlled predominantly Maronite northern Mount Lebanon, in return for supporting a future Tuscan conquest of Jerusalem and Damascus.

After the Tuscans' Ottoman ally, the pretender to the throne Sultan Yahya, proved incapable of mustering sufficient support within the Empire in 1609, Fakhr al-Din became Tuscany's "last hope for an ally of the region", according to Ossaretti. The Tuscans, their Papal allies, and Fakhr al-Din maintained correspondence between then and 1611. In mid-1609 Fakhr al-Din gave refuge to the Maronite patriarch Yuhanna Makhlouf upon the latter's flight from northern Mount Lebanon. In a 1610 letter from Pope Paul V to Makhlouf, the Pope entrusted Fakhr al-Din with the protection of the Maronite community. Sandys noted in 1610 that Fakhr al-Din had reactivated the port of Tyre for clandestine exchanges and trade with the Tuscans. The following year, he dispatched a Maronite bishop to be his representative in the court of Grand Duke Cosimo II and in the Holy See.

=== Ottoman expedition of 1613 and flight ===
Fakhr al-Din lost favor in Constantinople with the death of Murad Pasha in July 1611 and the succession of Nasuh Pasha. By then, the Ottoman imperial government, freed up from the wars with Austria and Iran and the Jelali revolts in Anatolia, had turned its attention to affairs in the Levant. The authorities had become wary of Fakhr al-Din's expanding territory, his alliance with Tuscany, his unsanctioned strengthening and garrisoning of fortresses, and his employment of outlawed sekbans. Nasuh Pasha had old grievances with Fakhr al-Din stemming from the latter's assistance to the Damascus janissaries in their standoff with imperial troops in Aleppo when the Grand Vizier had been governor there. In 1612 Fakhr al-Din sent his chief aide, or kethuda, Mustafa with 25,000 piasters to gain the goodwill of the Grand Vizier, who may have been offended by the gesture when compared with the much larger gift presented to his predecessor by Fakhr al-Din's son Ali in 1607. The Grand Vizier demanded Fakhr al-Din disband his sekbans, surrender the strategic fortresses of Shaqif Arnun and Subayba, and execute his ally, the chieftain of Baalbek, Yunus al-Harfush; the orders were ignored. Not long after, Fakhr al-Din repulsed an assault by the beylerbey of Damascus, Hafiz Ahmed Pasha, against Yunus al-Harfush and Ahmad Shihab.

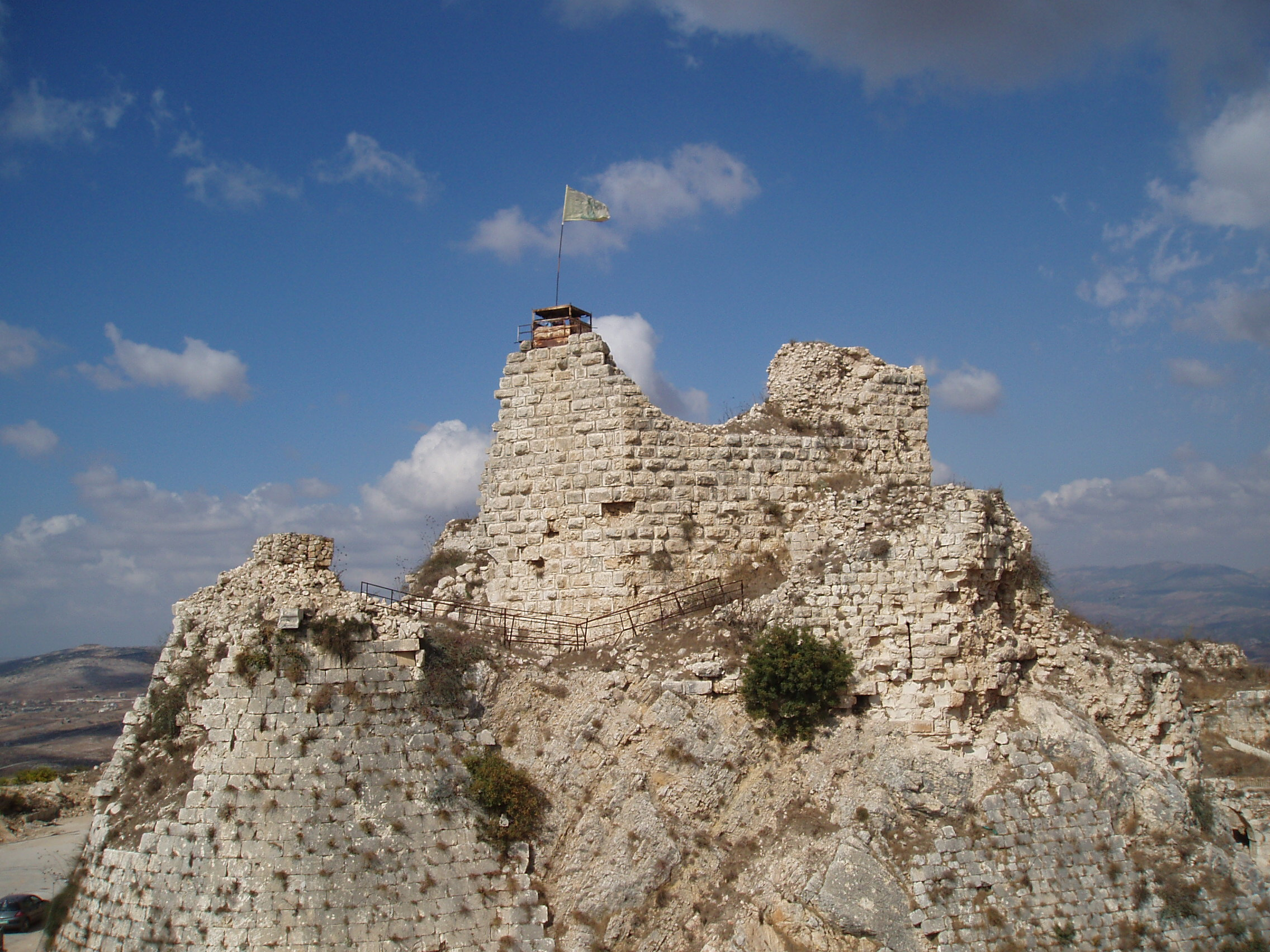
Shaqif Arnun (pictured in 2005) was a stronghold of Fakhr al-Din, guarding his domains from the south.

To check Fakhr al-Din, the Ottomans appointed Farrukh Pasha to the neighboring sanjaks of Ajlun and Nablus, and drove out two of his allied Bedouin chiefs from Ajlun and the Hauran, both of whom took refuge with Fakhr al-Din. The latter avoided direct conflict with the Ottoman government by deferring the Bedouin chiefs' requests for assistance while awaiting the imperial authorities' response to a gift of money and goods he sent. Nonetheless, at the urging of his Damascene janissary ally Hajj Kiwan, Fakhr al-Din moved to restore his allies to their home regions, sending with them his son Ali at the head of 3,000 men. With help from the Sayfas, who sought to mend ties with the Ma'ns, Ali defeated Farrukh Pasha and the faction of Damascene janissaries opposed to the Ma'ns at Muzayrib on 21 May 1613. In response, Nasuh Pasha appointed Ahmed Pasha at the head of 2,000 imperial janissaries and the troops of some sixty beylerbeys and sanjak-beys to move against Fakhr al-Din.

Fakhr al-Din garrisoned Shaqif Arnun and Subayba, both containing five years' worth of provisions and ammunition, with his sekbans under the commanders Husayn Yaziji and Husayn Tawil, respectively. He sent Ali to take safety with his Bedouin allies in the desert, while sending a Sunni delegation to Damascus led by Khalidi with a peace proposal entailing large payments to the authorities. The proposal was rejected, and on 16 September, Ahmed Pasha had all the roads from Mount Lebanon into the desert blocked and the port of Sidon blockaded to prevent Fakhr al-Din's escape by land or sea. He sent a new sanjak-bey to Safed, where Fakhr al-Din was headquartered at the time, prompting Fakhr al-Din's flight to Sidon. He bribed the deputy admiral of the blockade to allow his escape and boarded a European ship for Livorno, Tuscany.

Fakhr al-Din's sekbans defected to Ahmed Pasha during the campaign, and most of Fakhr al-Din's allies and other local chiefs, namely the Shihabs, Harfushes, Turabays, Hayars, and Qansuhs, (Note: The Turabays, Hayars and Qansuhs were Bedouin dynasties which held official power in their local areas dating from the Mamluk period (1260s–1516). The Turabays traditionally served as the sanjak-beys and multazims of Lajjun in northern Palestine, and their chiefs held the title of amir al-darbayn (commander of the Via Maris and Damascus–Jerusalem highways). The Hayars often served as sanjak-beys and multazims of Salamiyah in the central Syrian steppe and their chiefs held the title amir al-arab (commander of the Bedouins of Syria). The Qansuhs were traditionally sanjak-beys of Ajlun and Karak–Shawbak in northern and southern Transjordan, respectively, and their chiefs often served as amir al-hajj (commander of the annual Hajj pilgrimage caravan to Mecca).) also joined the Ottomans, with the exception of his Bedouin ally, the Mafarija chief Amr ibn Jabr, who refused to surrender Fakhr al-Din's son Ali. Abu-Husayn explains their defections as a reflection of "the precariousness of the alliances made by Fakhr al-Din" and the Ottomans' ability to reassert control over the Levant when they were "seriously challenged" there. The Sayfas used the campaign to restore their ties with the Ottoman imperial government and revive their former power. Yusuf's son Husayn backed Ahmed Pasha's siege of Shaqif Arnun and proceeded to burn Deir al-Qamar, the headquarters village of the Ma'ns. In the invasion of the Chouf, Ahmed Pasha and the Sayfas were helped by Druze rivals of Fakhr al-Din. The Ma'ns led by Fakhr al-Din's brother Yunus sued for peace, sending Sitt Nasab and a delegation of thirty Druze religious notables to Ahmed Pasha with a 25,000-piaster payment to him personally and a promised payment of 300,000 piasters to the Ottoman imperial authorities. Ahmed Pasha accepted and ordered Husayn to halt the burning of Deir al-Qamar.

== Exile in Tuscany and Sicily ==
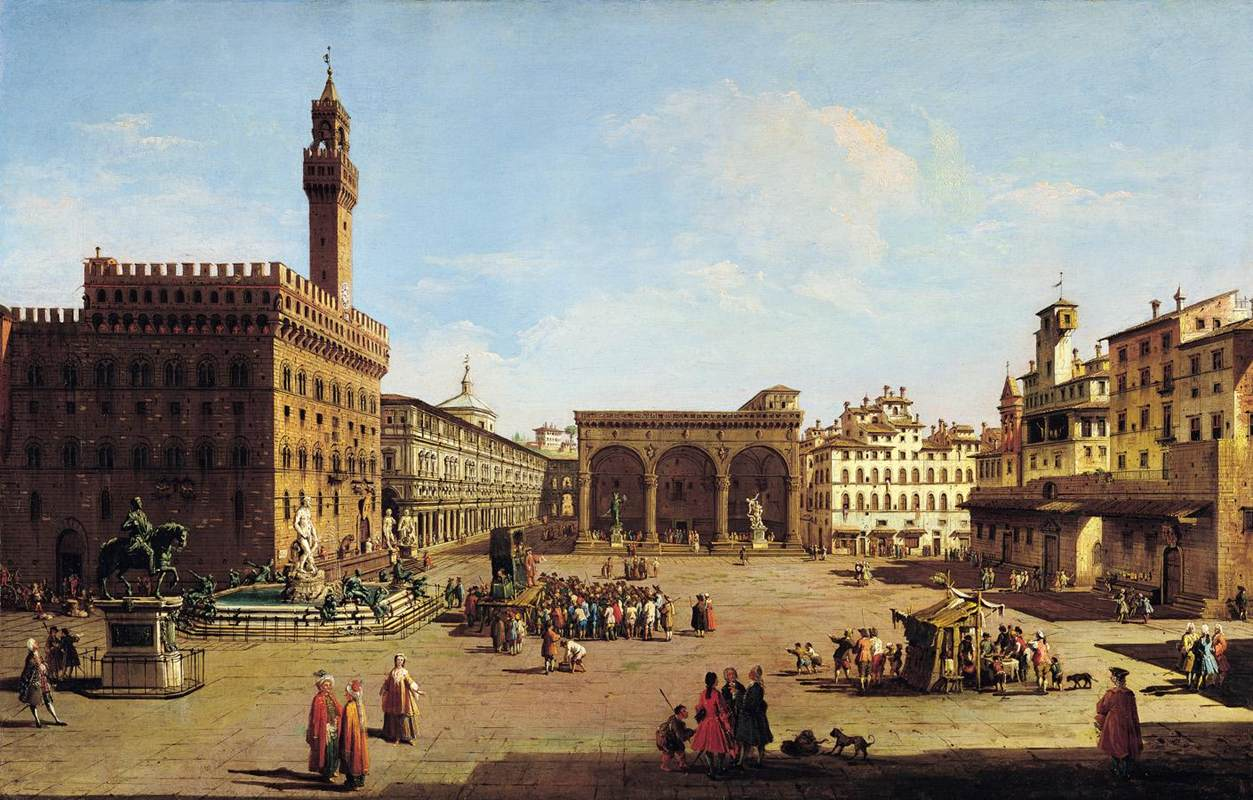
Fakhr al-Din lived in exile in different parts of Italy in 1613–1618, including about two years in Florence (pictured in the early 18th century).

Shortly after his arrival in Livorno on 3 November, Fakhr al-Din went to Florence. His arrival surprised the Medici, who offered to escort him back to Mount Lebanon and were irked by his refusal. Later that month, Pope Paul V informed the Medici of his opposition to military aid for Fakhr al-Din to avoid provoking a naval war with the Ottomans. The Medici also sought to avoid conflict and in correspondence with Nasuh Pasha in 1614 the latter offered to pardon Fakhr al-Din in return for restricting the port of Sidon to domestic trade with the Ottoman ports of Constantinople, Alexandretta and Alexandria. Ottoman–Tuscan negotiations about Fakhr al-Din's fate continued through 1615. After Nasuh Pasha's death in 1614, Fakhr al-Din also began direct attempts to reconcile with the Ottoman government.

Khalidi's chronicle omits Fakhr al-Din's time in Tuscany, mentioning only his departure and return. A supplement attributed to Khalidi by his chronicle's 20th-century editors provides a detailed account of Fakhr al-Din's time in exile, based in large part on Fakhr al-Din's narrations to Khalidi; Abu-Husayn calls its author "unknown", considering Khalidi's authorship to be "doubtful". Livorno remained Fakhr al-Din's primary residence, but during stays in Florence he was housed in the apartment of the late Pope Leo X in the Palazzo Vecchio. He signed a letter in May requesting permission to remain in Tuscany until it was safe for him to return to Mount Lebanon, after which he relocated to the Palazzo Medici where he remained until July 1615.

Afterwards, Fakhr al-Din moved to Messina in Sicily at the invitation of its viceroy, Pedro Téllez-Girón of the Spanish Habsburgs. The Spanish Habsburgs, who were the strongest advocates of a new crusade, probably held Fakhr al-Din against his will for the next two years, possibly to threaten the Ottomans, according to Olsaretti. The viceroy allowed him a reconnaissance visit to Mount Lebanon later in 1615. He was not permitted to disembark; instead, Yunus and other kinsmen and supporters greeted him on board and informed him that "all of the people of the Shuf [Chouf]" awaited his return. On his return to Sicily he stopped in Malta. When the viceroy moved, in succession, to Palermo and Naples, Fakhr al-Din accompanied him.

== Peak of power ==
=== Reestablishment of the Ma'nid domains ===
In June 1614 the Ottomans administratively reorganized Fakhr al-Din's former domains to curtail Ma'nid power, combining the sanjaks of Sidon-Beirut and Safed into a separate eyalet called Sidon and appointing to it a beylerbey from Constantinople. The new appointee redistributed control of the Druze Mountain's iltizam among pro-Ottoman Druze chiefs, restricting the Ma'ns' iltizam to the Chouf. Political circumstances in the Empire soon after shifted to the Ma'ns' favor, beginning with the replacement of the executed Nasuh Pasha in November 1614, the dissolution of the Sidon Eyalet in early 1615, and the dismissal of Ahmed Pasha in Damascus in April 1615. The Ottoman–Safavid wars resumed about the same time, siphoning Ottoman troops from the Levant to the Iranian front. The authorities appointed Ali to the governorships of Sidon-Beirut and Safed in December 1615 in return for large payments. The imperial government's principal objective, the dismantlement of the Ma'nid-held fortresses of Shaqif Arnun and Subayba, was carried out in May 1616.

Despite their official appointments, the Ma'ns faced continued opposition from their traditional Druze rivals, who were backed by the Sayfas. The Ma'ns defeated them in four engagements in the heart of the Druze Mountain. In the course of the fighting, the Ma'ns recaptured Beirut and the Keserwan from the Sayfas. Ali granted the iltizam in his sanjak mainly to his uncle Yunus and the Ma'ns' allies from the Tanukh and Abu al-Lama families. Growing opposition to the Ma'ns by the Shias of Safed Sanjak culminated with their support for Fakhr al-Din's former sekban commander Yaziji's efforts to replace Ali as sanjak-bey and their alliance with the Shia Harfushes in 1617–1618. Yaziji was killed after taking up office in Safed in June 1618, and Ali was restored to the post.

The Ottomans pardoned Fakhr al-Din and he returned to Mount Lebanon, arriving in Acre on 29 September 1618. From that point there was no further active Druze opposition to Fakhr al-Din. In Acre Fakhr al-Din held a reception for the rural chieftains across the Levant arriving to greet him, which included all those who joined the 1613 expedition against the Ma'ns. Uneasy about the growing ties between the Harfushes and the Shia chiefs of Safed, he moved to supervise the collection of taxes in the predominantly Shia Bilad Bishara area in December. This prompted the Shia notable families of Ali Saghir, Munkir, Shukr, and Daghir to take refuge with Yunus al-Harfush and evade payment. Fakhr al-Din responded by destroying their homes. In response to the flight of the Jallaqs, a Shia family from Safed city, to Afiq, he captured Afiq, killed fifteen Shia refugees there and took captive the Jallaq women. Afterward, the Shia chiefs of the sanjak agreed to return and concede to Fakhr al-Din's rule; he subsequently released the captives. Shia levies thereafter joined his army in his later military campaigns.

=== War with the Sayfas and control of the Maronite districts ===
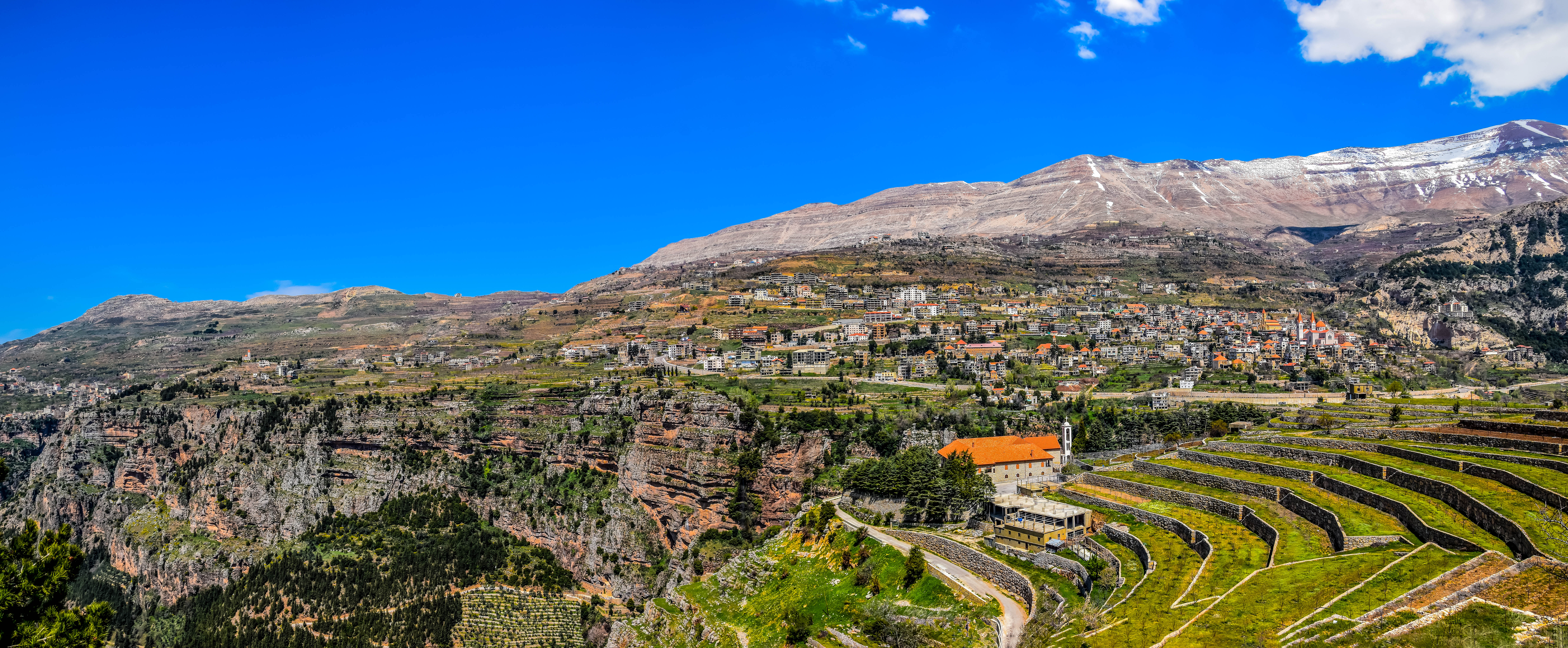
In 1619–1622 Fakhr al-Din occupied and gained the tax farms of the predominantly Maronite nahiyas of Byblos, Batroun, Bsharri (pictured in 2016) and Dinniyeh in northern Mount Lebanon from Yusuf Sayfa.

During his reception of the Levantine chiefs in Acre, Fakhr al-Din had berated the Sayfas for their hostility in the preceding five years. In 1618 or 1619, he moved against the Sayfas with imperial sanction under the guise of assisting Tripoli's beylerbey Umar Kittanji Pasha with the collection of taxes in his eyalet, which continued to be controlled by the Sayfas. On 4 February 1619 he captured and looted their stronghold of Hisn Akkar and four days later besieged Yusuf and the latter's Druze allies in the Krak des Chevaliers.

During the siege, word had reached Fakhr al-Din that the Ottoman imperial government, probably seeking to avoid a total victory by the Ma'ns, reappointed Yusuf to the governorship of Tripoli. Fakhr al-Din pressed on with the siege and demanded a payment of 150,000 piasters from the Sayfas, while he sent a detachment to burn the Sayfas' home village of Akkar and gained the defection of the Sayfas' men in the forts of Byblos and Smar Jbeil. The beylerbeys of Damascus and Aleppo mobilized their troops in Homs and Hama, respectively, in support of Yusuf, who afterward persuaded Fakhr al-Din to accept a promissory payment of 50,000 piasters and lift the siege in March. Fakhr al-Din's control of the Byblos and Batroun nahiyas and his earlier leasing of their iltizam from Umar Kittanji was recognized by Yusuf in May in lieu of the promised payment.

Fakhr al-Din was charged by the imperial authorities with collecting tax arrears from Yusuf in June/July 1621, thereby giving him imperial cover to assault the Sayfas once again. He captured the Bahsas fort on Tripoli's southern outskirts and besieged the Citadel of Tripoli. Under pressure, Yusuf agreed to sell Fakhr al-Din his properties in Ghazir and Antelias, both in the Keserwan, and Beirut, in return for cancelling Yusuf's personal debts to him. The siege was maintained pending Yusuf's payment of the tax arrears to the government, until Yusuf persuaded the authorities that Fakhr al-Din was using his imperial commission to annex Tripoli. Upon the imperial government's orders, Fakhr al-Din withdrew from Tripoli on 2 October 1621. Yusuf was dismissed again in October/November 1622 after failing to remit the promised tax payments, but refused to hand over power to his replacement Umar Kittanji, who in turn requested Fakhr al-Din's military support. Fakhr al-Din complied in return for the iltizam of the Tripoli nahiyas of Dinniyeh, Bsharri and Akkar. Once Fakhr al-Din set out from Ghazir, Yusuf abandoned Tripoli for Akkar.

Fakhr al-Din thereafter sent his Maronite ally Abu Safi Khazen, the brother of his fiscal and political adviser and scribe, or mudabbir, Abu Nadir Khazen, to occupy Maronite-populated Bsharri, thereby ending the rule of the local Maronite muqaddams established since the late 14th century. The dismissed muqaddam and his son were soon after executed by Fakhr al-Din in connection to the son's raid of a Maronite monastery near Hasroun. The Maronites of Bsharri are likely to have welcomed the end of the muqaddams, the last several of whom failed to protect the interests of their church and community. (Note: Following the fall of Fakhr al-Din in 1633, the "effects of disappearance of the muqaddamate" from Bsharri began to be felt. Over the long term, the Maronite autonomy there traditionally provided by the muqaddams was weakened and by the end of the 17th century, the Shia Muslim clan of Hamade began a decades-long domination of the nahiya.)

Fakhr al-Din secured the defection of Yusuf's son Beylik and their combined forces reentered Tripoli on 13 March 1623. An imperial order arrived a few days later reappointing Yusuf to the eyalet. Umar Kittanji attempted to resist his dismissal, but Fakhr al-Din, by then in practical control of most of the eyalet, insisted that the imperial government's orders be followed. He subsequently escorted the outgoing beylerbey to Beirut and ordered Beylik to return to his father. In May/June, Fakhr al-Din mobilized his forces in Bsharri in support of Yusuf's rebellious nephew Sulayman, who controlled Safita. Yusuf had moved against Sulayman, but relented after Fakhr al-Din's attempted intervention, thereby confirming the Ma'ns as the practical overlords of Safita. Meanwhile, Beylik, who had been appointed by his father to govern Akkar, expelled Yusuf's sekbans from the nahiyas and declared support for Fakhr al-Din.

=== Battle of Anjar and aftermath ===
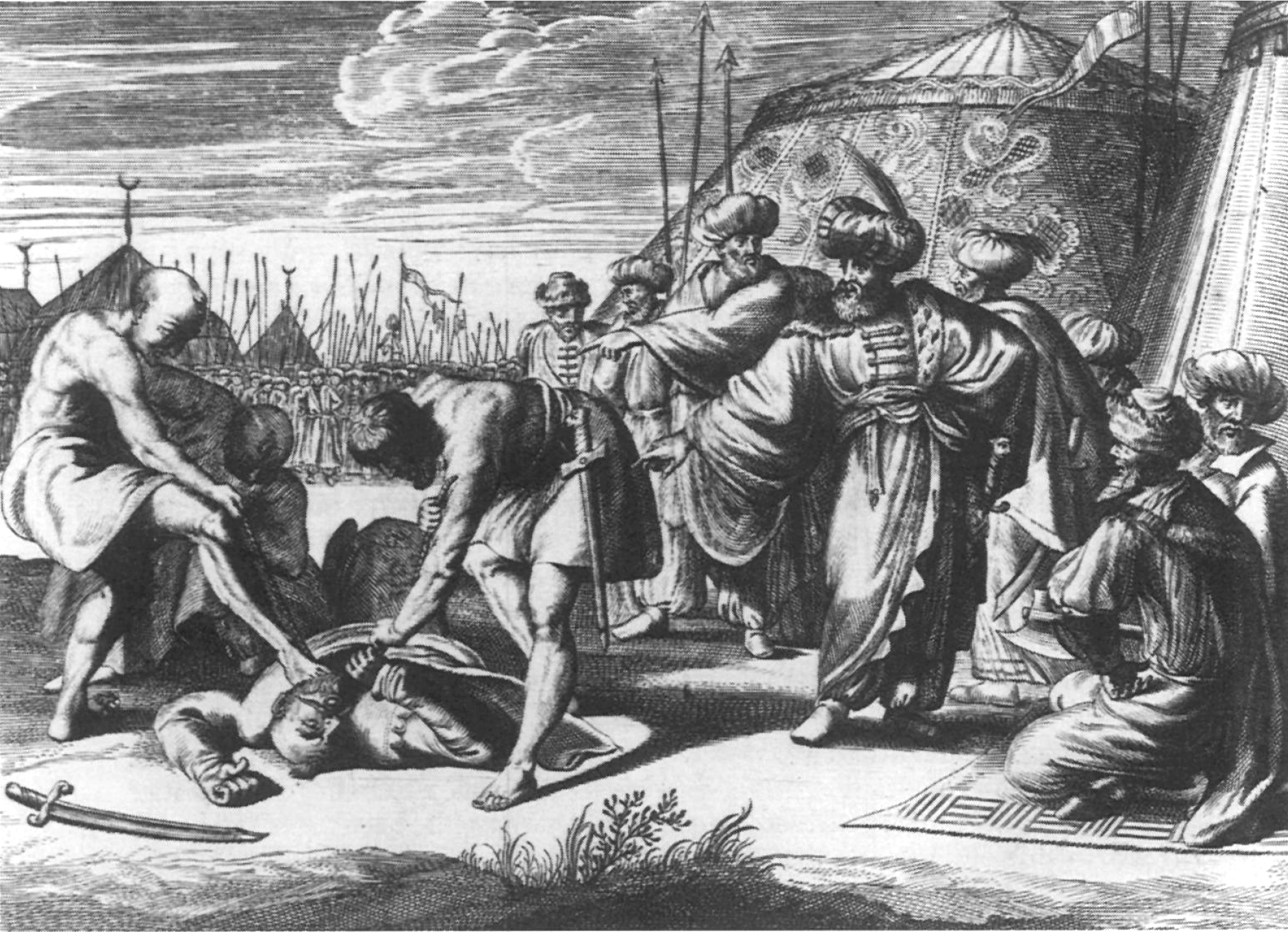
An engraving by Olfert Dapper from 1677 depicting Fakhr al-Din's capture of Mustafa Pasha, beylerbey of Damascus, at the Battle of Anjar in 1623. Fakhr al-Din is shown as the standing, turbaned figure pointing toward Mustafa Pasha, who is being held to the ground.

In 1623, Yunus al-Harfush prohibited the Druze of the Chouf from cultivating their lands in the southern Beqaa, angering Fakhr al-Din. In August/September 1623 he stationed sekbans in the southern Beqaa village of Qabb Ilyas and evicted the Harfushes. Meanwhile, in June or July, the imperial authorities had replaced Fakhr al-Din's son Ali as sanjak-bey of Safed and replaced his other son Husayn and Mustafa Kethuda as the sanjak-beys of Ajlun and Nablus respectively with local opponents of Fakhr al-Din. The imperial authorities soon after restored the Ma'ns to Ajlun and Nablus, but not to Safed. The Ma'ns thereupon moved to assume control of Ajlun and Nablus, prompting Yunus al-Harfush to call on the janissary leader Kurd Hamza, who wielded significant influence over the beylerbey of Damascus, Mustafa Pasha, to block their advance. Kurd Hamza then secured Yunus al-Harfush's appointment to Safed, followed by a failed attempt by Fakhr al-Din to outbid him for the governorship.

Fakhr al-Din launched a campaign against the Turabays and Farrukhs in northern Palestine, but was defeated in a battle at the Awja River near Ramla. On his way back to Mount Lebanon from the abortive Palestine campaign, Fakhr al-Din was notified that the imperial government had reappointed his sons and allies to Safed, Ajlun, and Nablus. The reversal was linked to the successions of Sultan Murad IV (r. 1623–1640) and Grand Vizier Kemankeş Ali Pasha, the latter of whom had been bribed by Fakhr al-Din's agent in Constantinople to restore the Ma'ns to their former sanjaks. Mustafa Pasha and Kurd Hamza, nonetheless, proceeded to launch an expedition against the Ma'ns. Fakhr al-Din arrived in Qabb Ilyas on 22 October, and immediately moved to restore lost money and provisions from the Palestine campaign by raiding the nearby villages of Karak Nuh and Sar'in, both held by the Harfushes.

Afterward, the Damascenes, the Harfushes, and the Sayfas set out from Damascus, while Fakhr al-Din mobilized his Druze fighters, sekbans, and Shia levies. He sent the Shihabs to serve as his vanguard in the tower of Anjar, but by the time Fakhr al-Din arrived there in early November 1623, the Shihabs had been driven off and the Sayfas and Harfushes had taken over the tower. Fakhr al-Din immediately routed the Damascene janissaries at Anjar and captured Mustafa Pasha, while Kurd Hamza and Yunus al-Harfush escaped to Aleppo. Fakhr al-Din extracted from the beylerbey confirmation of the Ma'ns' governorships, his appointment over Gaza Sanjak, his son Mansur over Lajjun Sanjak, and Ali over the southern Beqaa nahiya. The appointments to Gaza, Nablus and Lajjun were not implemented due to the opposition of local powerholders.

Fakhr al-Din plundered Baalbek soon after Anjar and captured and destroyed its citadel on 28 March, after a months-long siege. The Aleppine historian Utayfi observed in 1634 that "the city of Baalbek ... was in ruins ... destroyed by Fakhr al-Din Ibn Ma'n in his war with Banu al-Harfush". Yunus al-Harfush was imprisoned by the beylerbey of Aleppo and executed in 1625, the same year that Fakhr al-Din gained the governorship of the Baalbek nahiya, according to Duwayhi. The imperial government had replaced Mustafa Pasha in January 1624, but without Fakhr al-Din's agreement, the new beylerbey could not assume office in Damascus. Mustafa Pasha remained in place and Fakhr al-Din secured from him the governorship of the Zabadani nahiya for his Shihab proxy Qasim ibn Ali. By March, Fakhr al-Din turned against Mustafa Pasha in favor of his replacement, but the new beylerbey died soon afterward, and Mustafa Pasha was reinstated in April. Relations between Fakhr al-Din and Mustafa Pasha subsequently soured.

=== Takeover of Tripoli and zenith ===
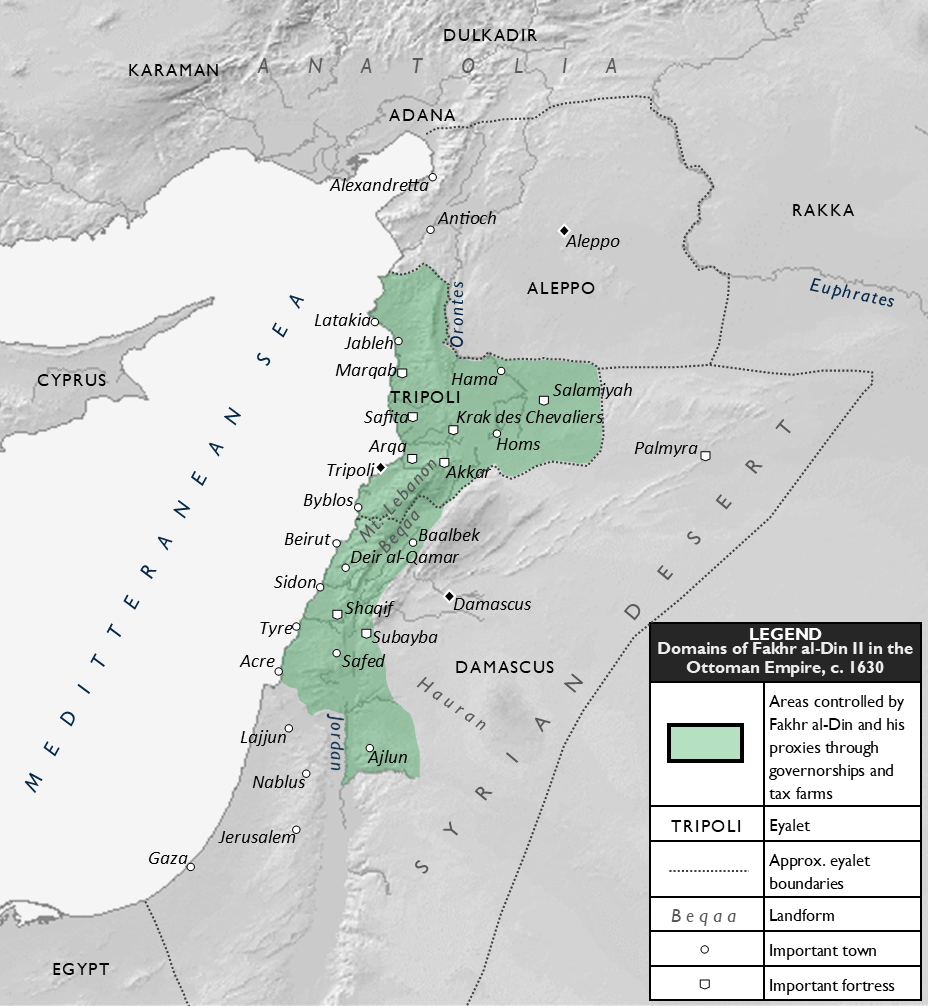
Map of the territory, consisting of governorships and tax farms, within the Ottoman Levant held directly by Fakhr al-Din or indirectly through his family and other proxies, at the height of his power, c. 1630

Information about the career of Fakhr al-Din after 1624 is limited due to the deaths of his main contemporary chroniclers and the increasing silence of known Ottoman government sources. Most information about his post-1624 years are provided by Duwayhi. The claim by the local 19th-century chroniclers Haydar al-Shihabi and Tannus al-Shidyaq that Murad IV, powerless against Fakhr al-Din's de facto control over large parts of the Levant, recognized him as sultan al-Barr ('ruler of the Land [of the Levant]') in 1624, is a fabrication, according to Abu-Husayn.

In 1624, Fakhr al-Din lent his backing to Umar Kittanji after the latter was denied entry into Tripoli by Yusuf, who resisted Umar Kittanji's reappointment to the eyalet that year. After mobilizing in support of Umar Kittanji in Batroun in April, Fakhr al-Din stalled from further military action while negotiating with Yusuf over fiscal concessions. Fakhr al-Din secured another four-year iltizam over Byblos, Batroun and Bsharri. Yusuf was restored as beylerbey in August, but his practical control was limited to Tripoli city, the Krak des Chevaliers, the Koura nahiya, and the Jableh sanjak, while most of the remaining areas, including Homs, were held by Fakhr al-Din or his allies and sons-in-law among Yusuf's sons and nephews.

A few months after Yusuf's death in July 1625, Fakhr al-Din launched an abortive assault against Tripoli. He cooperated with its new beylerbey, Mustafa Pasha ibn Iskandar, in the latter's offensive against the Sayfas in the eyalet. He forced out his old ally Sulayman Sayfa from the Safita fortress and was later ceded the fortresses of Krak des Chevaliers and Marqab by Yusuf's sons. In return, Fakhr al-Din influenced the beylerbey to leave the Sayfas undisturbed. In September 1626, he captured the fortress of Salamiyah, followed by Hama and Homs, appointing his deputies to govern them.

Following the appointments of two more beylerbeys to the eyalet, Fakhr al-Din was appointed beylerbey of Tripoli in 1627, according solely to Duwayhi. The near-contemporary Aleppine historian Ramadan al-Utayfi noted that Fakhr al-Din controlled Tripoli until his downfall, but does not specify whether he held office. Ottoman government records affirm that he held the iltizam of the Tripoli nahiyas of Arqa, Akkar, Dinniyeh, Safita, Krak des Chevaliers, Byblos, Batroun, in addition to the iltizam of Sidon-Beirut, Safed and Baalbek, for most of 1625–1630. His iltizam were expanded to Jableh and Latakia in 1628–1629. By the early 1630s, Muhibbi noted that Fakhr al-Din had captured many places around Damascus, controlled thirty fortresses, commanded a large army of sekbans, and that the "only thing left for him to do was to claim the Sultanate".

== Fall and execution ==
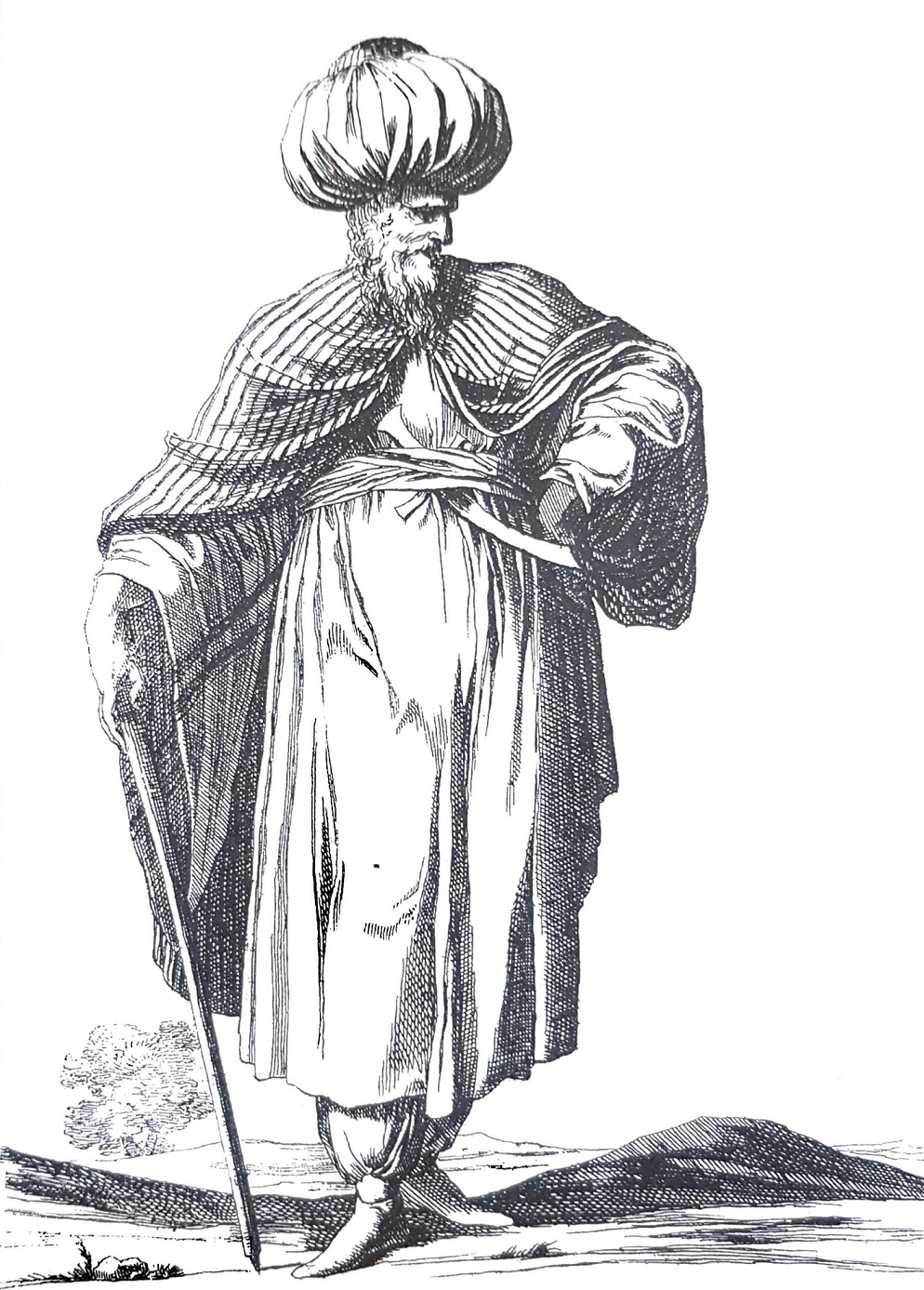
An engraving of Fakhr al-Din, published in a 1646 work by his physician in 1632–1633, the Nazareth-based Franciscan Eugène Roger. The portrait was probably not drawn from life, but rather depicted what the illustrator thought a Middle Eastern figure would look like.

In 1630 or 1631, Fakhr al-Din denied the attempted winter housing of imperial troops returning from a failed campaign against the Safavids in territory under his control. The early 18th-century Ottoman historian Mustafa Naima held that Fakhr al-Din's growing army and power by this point induced fear among the Ottomans that he would take over Damascus. Murad IV was alarmed at his growing presence in northern Syria, near the Empire's Anatolian heartland. Numerous complaints about Fakhr al-Din were submitted to the Sultan. The Ottomans' victories against the Safavids in 1629 are likely to have freed up their forces to deal with Fakhr al-Din and other rebels across the Empire.

The imperial authorities appointed the veteran general Kuchuk Ahmed Pasha to the governorship of Damascus and promoted him to the high rank of vizier in 1632 for the purpose of eliminating Fakhr al-Din. Kuchuk led a large army toward Mount Lebanon, defeating the Ma'ns led by Ali, who was slain, near Khan Hasbaya in Wadi al-Taym. Fakhr al-Din and his retinue subsequently took refuge in a cave in Niha in the southern Chouf or further south in Jezzine. Unable to access the cave, Kuchuk started fires around it to smoke out Fakhr al-Din. He and his men consequently surrendered to Kuchuk. His sons Mansur and Husayn, the latter of whom was stationed in Marqab, had already been captured by Kuchuk. His sons Hasan, Haydar, and Bulak, his brother Yunus and nephew Hamdan ibn Yunus were all executed by Kuchuk during the expedition.

Kuchuk confiscated the money and goods in Fakhr al-Din's possession. A 1634 document from the Sharia Court in Damascus, which recorded the confiscation and disposal of his estate, referred to Fakhr al-Din as "a man well known for having rebelled against the sublime Sultanate". Kuchuk escorted him, chained on a horse, through Damascus where the local poets sang Kuchuk's praises for toppling Fakhr al-Din. Afterward, Fakhr al-Din was sent to Constantinople. There, he was imprisoned in Yedikule, while his two sons were sent to the Galatasaray.

In March or April 1635, Fakhr al-Din was beheaded and Mansur was strangled and tossed into the sea on the orders of Murad IV. Fakhr al-Din's body was displayed in the Hippodrome. The executions may have been prompted by complaints against the Ma'ns, particularly the operations of Fakhr al-Din's nephew Mulhim ibn Yunus against Fakhr al-Din's government-appointed replacement in the Chouf, Ali Alam al-Din. After his execution, his wives, all of whom were imprisoned in the Citadel of Damascus, were hanged. His maternal kinsmen, the Tanukh, were all killed by Alam al-Din. Husayn, still a youth, was spared execution and went on to have a career as a high-ranking imperial official and diplomat.

In the assessment of Olsaretti, "more profound causes than a string of military events were responsible for Fakhr al-Din's fall". Among the contributing factors were the unstable relations between Constantinople and the Levantine provinces with every change of sultan and grand vizier; Fakhr al-Din permanently fell out of imperial favor with Murad IV's accession in 1623. Fakhr al-Din's victories over his local rivals, such as the Sayfas and Mustafa Pasha, removed any serious checks on his power by local forces, eventually provoking an imperial backlash. His increased dependence on mercenaries in the late 1620s allowed and financially necessitated him to raise more revenue from the local population, risking their goodwill towards him. Duwayhi noted that in 1631 Fakhr al-Din sold large quantities of grain to foreign merchants during a period of scarcity, which increased food prices and burdened the inhabitants of his territories. Moreover, social and political conditions in general began to favor stronger, centralized states at the expense of local actors, such as the Ma'nid emirate.

== Politics ==
=== Economic policies ===
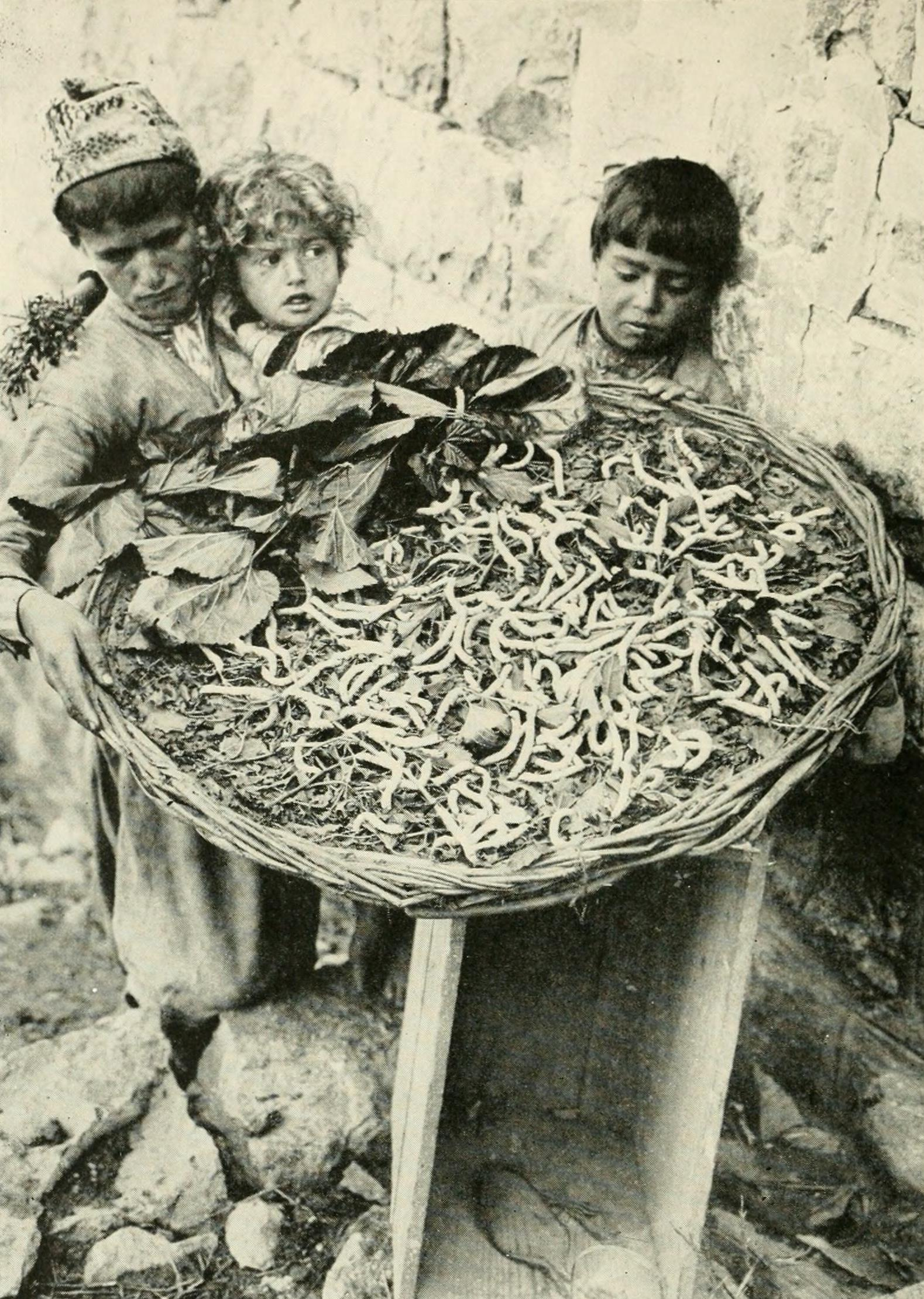
Silkworms feeding on mulberry leaves in Mount Lebanon (pictured in 1922). Fakhr al-Din promoted and protected the region's burgeoning silk industry.

Fakhr al-Din's basic governing policy was based on the collection of sufficient revenue to satisfy the exorbitant demands of the Ottoman imperial government and to elicit the goodwill of the pashas of Damascus through bribes. To raise revenue, he introduced more productive agricultural methods to his territories and promoted commerce. Sandys, who visited Sidon in 1611, observed that Fakhr al-Din had amassed a fortune "gathered by wiles and extortion" from locals and foreign merchants, counterfeited Dutch coins, and was a "severe justice", who restored the ruined structures and repopulated the once-abandoned settlements in his domains. The tax farms which Fakhr al-Din and his family held practically undisturbed from the 1590s were the principal source of his income. The price the Ma'ns paid the imperial authorities for the tax farms remained fixed despite their increasing value, enabling Fakhr al-Din to keep the greater part of their revenue.

Fakhr al-Din protected commercial agriculture in his tax farms and encouraged the growing of cash crops, which were purchased by foreign merchants at a relatively high cost. Special attention was paid to silk production due to high demand in Europe. The Levantine raw silk market had developed in the mid-16th century due to fluctuations in the Iranian silk supply. Mount Lebanon became a center of production by 1550 and its silk exports became an important commodity in Venetian trade by the 1570s. Once in control of Tripoli Eyalet in 1627, Fakhr al-Din planted 12,000 or 14,000 mulberry trees in Tripoli's outskirts and another large mulberry grove in nearby Hisah. As part of his efforts to foster the export of silk, he sent a gift of silk to Tuscany, which reciprocated the following year by sending him five vessels of goods. Significant profits were also derived from cotton, grain, olive oil, and wine. In Safed, where political and economic conditions in the sanjak had deteriorated in the years preceding Fakhr al-Din's appointment, the imperial authorities lauded him in 1605 for "guarding the country, keeping the Bedouins in check, ensuring the welfare and tranquility of the population, promoting agriculture, and increasing prosperity", a state of affairs affirmed by Khalidi.

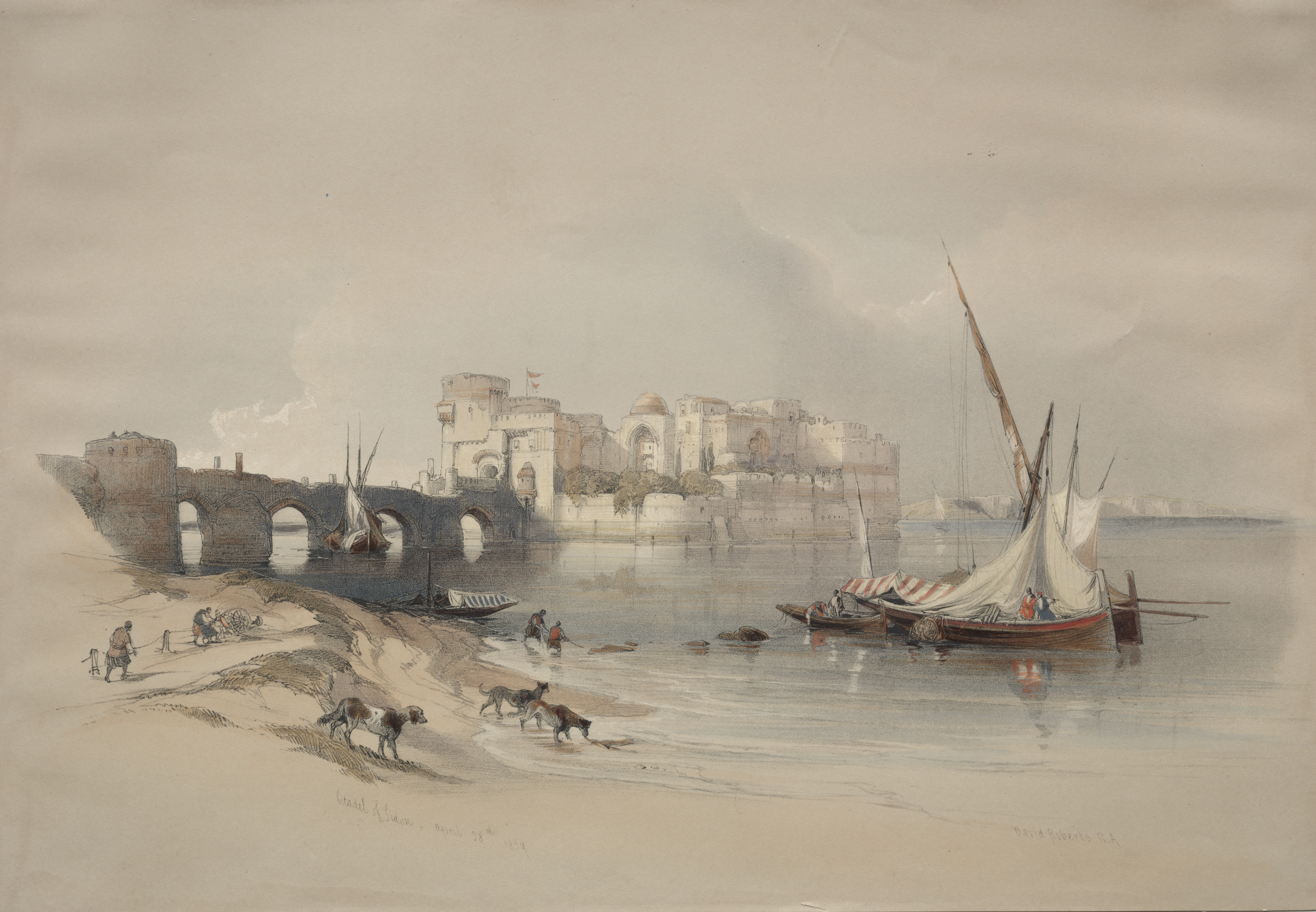
The port town of Sidon (pictured in 1843), capital of the Sidon-Beirut Sanjak, which Fakhr al-Din and his family governed between 1593 and 1633 with occasional interruption

The Ottoman naval defeat by a Spanish–Venetian coalition at Lepanto in 1571 had increased European economic and political influence in the eastern Mediterranean, including a revival of European–Levantine trade. Towards the end of the 16th century and during the early 17th century, the Ottoman Empire experienced a long-term economic crisis characterized by high inflation, heavy taxation, and political instability. Fakhr al-Din turned the changing economic circumstances to his advantage by opening the ports of Sidon, Beirut and Acre to European trade ships, building hostel-warehouses—known as khans—for merchants there, and establishing friendly ties with European powers. (Note: Beginning in the 1580s, prolonged severe inflation occurring in Western Europe began affecting the Ottoman Empire. Its effects were felt in the Levant, in particular, by at least 1591 as Duwayhi noted "prices rose tremendously [that year] ... and many people died of hunger". To alleviate its fiscal woes and meet the costs of the wars with Iran, the Ottoman government debased its currency, resulting in foreign coinage overtaking its internal markets and in widespread counterfeiting. The Ottomans resolved to employ stringent taxation measures, which caused economic ruin in the provinces.) In contrast to the extortion of foreign merchants by the Assafs and Sayfas, the contemporary Arabic, Venetian, and Tuscan sources all emphasized the close relations between Fakhr al-Din, the French, English, Dutch, and Tuscan merchants and the English and French consuls in Sidon.

Fakhr al-Din used a local merchant as his representative in negotiations with foreign traders. In 1622, he secured the release of French traders captured by Moroccan pirates in Acre and assisted the completion of their activities in the town. In 1625, before Fakhr al-Din's capture of Tripoli, the governor of Aleppo had that city's fortifications dismantled to sway foreign merchants there to operate in Aleppine ports; instead, the mostly French and Flemish traders relocated to Fakhr al-Din's Sidon. Under his watch, Sidon was poised to continue prospering at the expense of Aleppo and its Mediterranean ports. In 1630, the Medici granted Fakhr al-Din's request to post a permanent representative to Sidon by dispatching an unofficial consul who operated under the French flag to avoid violating Ottoman capitulation agreements. In the assessment of Salibi, at a time when the Empire "was sinking to destitution because of its failure to adapt to changing circumstances, the realm of Faḫr al-dīn Maʿn [sic], in the southern Lebanon [range] and Galilee, attracted attention as a tiny corner into which the silver of Europe flowed".

=== Fortifications and troops ===
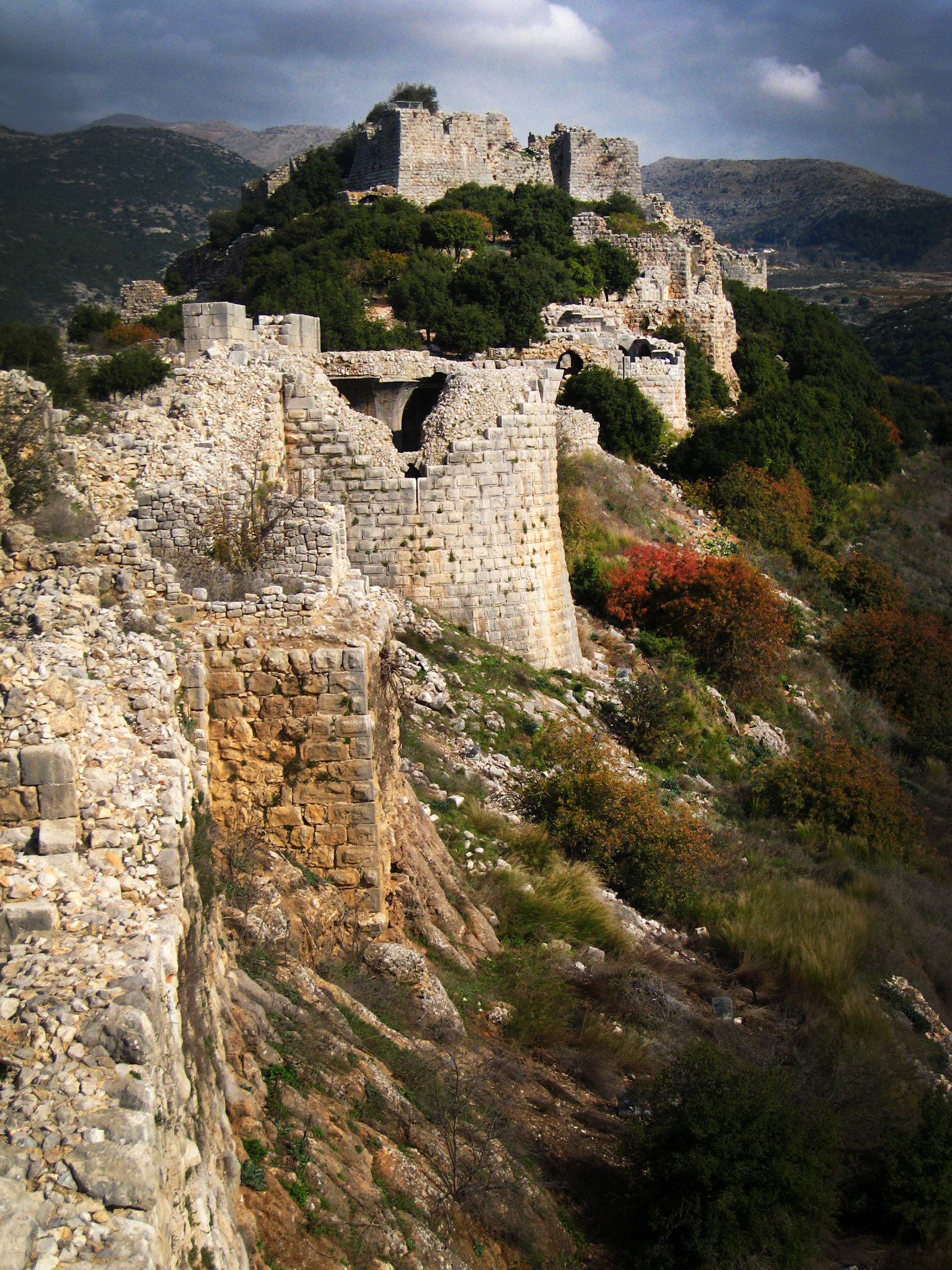
Subayba (pictured in 2009), built on the Mount Hermon range, was one of Fakhr al-Din's most important fortresses.

Fakhr al-Din spent the surpluses from his iltizam mainly on fortifications and other infrastructure, which promoted the order and stability required for agriculture and trade to thrive. He obtained and strengthened fortresses throughout his early career, starting with the Chouf redoubt of Niha in 1590, followed in 1594 by fortifications in Beirut, Sidon's inland fort, and the fort guarding Sidon's port. After his appointment to Safed, he obtained Shaqif Arnun in Jabal Amil, formerly held by the Shia Sa'b family and which he heavily provisioned and garrisoned, and Subayba in Mount Hermon. Sandys noted that Fakhr al-Din's "invincible forts" were equipped for a lengthy war. After returning from exile in 1618, he strengthened the fortifications of Acre. The coastal forts of Sidon, Beirut, and Acre were "remarkable for both their strength and the fact they incorporated storage for merchandise", according to Olsaretti. He built watchtowers to guard the mulberry groves he planted in and around Tripoli.

Fakhr al-Din kept the costs of his private army relatively low during his early career as he relied mainly on local peasant levies. Although generally less skilled than professional soldiers, their permanent presence made them readily available in times of war. European government estimates of his local forces between 1605 and 1614 ranged from 10,000 to 30,000, while Sandys estimated the number to be 40,000 Muslims and Christians. Local levies constituted the bulk of the Ma'nid army until the Battle of Anjar in 1623. The peasants' principal responsibility was agriculture, which limited the amount of time and the distance in which the Ma'ns could deploy them during campaigns. As their territories and agricultural production grew, the Ma'ns' use of peasant armies decreased. Khalidi noted that in 1617 the Ma'ns were not able to mobilize more than a small number of troops because the bulk of the levies were needed to work the mulberry groves.

According to Khalidi and a Tuscan agent sent to Sidon, in 1614 Fakhr al-Din employed 1,500 professional infantry and 150 mounted sekban musketeers, who accounted for his largest single expense. The sekbans were a mobile force used in small-scale engagements, sieges, patrols over key roads, and against pirates and brigands. From the 1620s onward, Fakhr al-Din relied on increasing numbers of sekbans. He compensated for the higher cost of their employment by taking larger shares of the surplus from his iltizam at the expense of the peasantry.

== Assessment ==
Fakhr al-Din's political ambitions extended well beyond the Druze Mountain and he attached equal importance to controlling the sanjaks and eyalets of Sidon-Beirut, Safed, Tripoli, and Ajlun. Harris places Fakhr al-Din, along with the heads of the Janbulad, Assaf, Sayfa, and Turabay families, in a category of late 16th–early 17th-century Levantine "super chiefs ... serviceable for the Ottoman pursuit of 'divide and rule' ... They could war among themselves and even with the governor of Damascus ... but were in deep trouble if the Ottomans became agitated about revenue or loyalty". In the assessment of the historian Adnan Bakhit, Fakhr al-Din was a Syrian strongman who was afforded space by the Ottomans to suppress and eliminate other local strongmen until he was destroyed by the Ottomans to facilitate their centralized rule over the Syrian eyalets. The Sunni Muslim establishment in Ottoman Damascus generally considered Fakhr al-Din as a tyrant, rebel, and infidel.

Salibi held that in the "annals of Ottoman Syria" Fakhr al-Din "stands out as a brilliant figure by any standard". In his assessment, Fakhr al-Din "was a born adventurer who combined military skill and eminent qualities of leadership with a keen business acumen and unusual powers of observation". The 17th-century English academic and clergyman Henry Maundrell remarked that Fakhr al-Din was "a man much above the ordinary level of a Turkish [Ottoman] genius".

Salibi further noted that although Fakhr al-Din was "a rapacious tyrant who weighed his subjects down with taxes", he was "enlightened enough to realize that the better the condition of a people, the more they can pay". Sidon, Beirut, Acre and their mountainous countryside prospered under Fakhr al-Din. He helped modernize agriculture in his territories with Italian expertise and was the first to promote silk as a cash crop in Mount Lebanon at a time of global demand. Through his ties with the French, the Tuscans and the Papacy, he fostered the most significant European political and economic penetration of Sidon and Beirut since the collapse of the Crusader states in the late 13th century.

Under his stewardship, the city of Sidon attained political significance for the first time in its modern history. The Lebanese nationalist and Arab nationalist histories of Sidon written in the 1960s by Munir al-Khuri and Abd al-Aziz Salim, respectively, both commend Fakhr al-Din and note his rule was a golden age for the city.

== Legacy ==
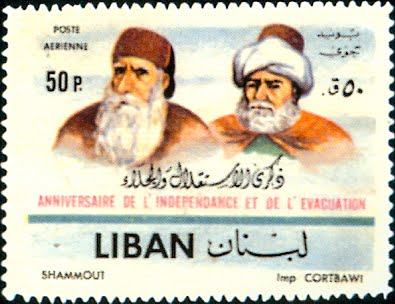
A 1961 Lebanese stamp portraying Fakhr al-Din (right) and Bashir Shihab II (left) in commemoration of Lebanon's independence in 1946. Fakhr al-Din is considered by the Lebanese as the founder of the country.

After Fakhr al-Din's downfall, the Ottomans attempted, unsuccessfully, to undo the unity of the Druze-dominated Chouf and the Maronite-dominated Keserwan forged under Fakhr al-Din. In 1660, the Ottomans reestablished the Sidon Eyalet and in 1697, awarded Fakhr al-Din's grandnephew Ahmad ibn Mulhim the iltizam of the Chouf, Gharb, Jurd, Matn, and Keserwan. The singular rule over these mountain nahiyas by Ahmad and his successors from the Shihab clan inaugurated what became known to later historians as the "Lebanese emirate". Although the term was not used until the days of the Shihab ruler Bashir II (r. 1789–1840), the system of fiscal cantons in Mount Lebanon introduced by the Shihabs in 1711 was the precursor to the Mount Lebanon Mutasarrifate established in 1861, which in turn, was the precursor of the modern Lebanese Republic.

Although he did not actually establish a Lebanese state, Fakhr al-Din is regarded by the Lebanese people as the founder of their modern country because he united the Druze and Maronite districts of Mount Lebanon, the neighboring Mediterranean coastal cities, and the Beqaa Valley under a single authority for the first time in history. According to Salibi, Fakhr al-Din's only "enduring" political legacy was the tenuous, symbiotic union of the Maronites and the Druze, which became a significant development throughout Mount Lebanon's later history. In the view of Harris, Fakhr al-Din inaugurated the continued interaction among the Druze, Maronite, Shia, and Sunni communal elites of the constituent regions of modern Lebanon, namely Mount Lebanon, Jabal Amil, the Beqaa Valley and the coast. From the establishment of the French Mandatory state of Greater Lebanon in 1920, Lebanese schoolchildren have been taught that Fakhr al-Din was the country's historical founder.

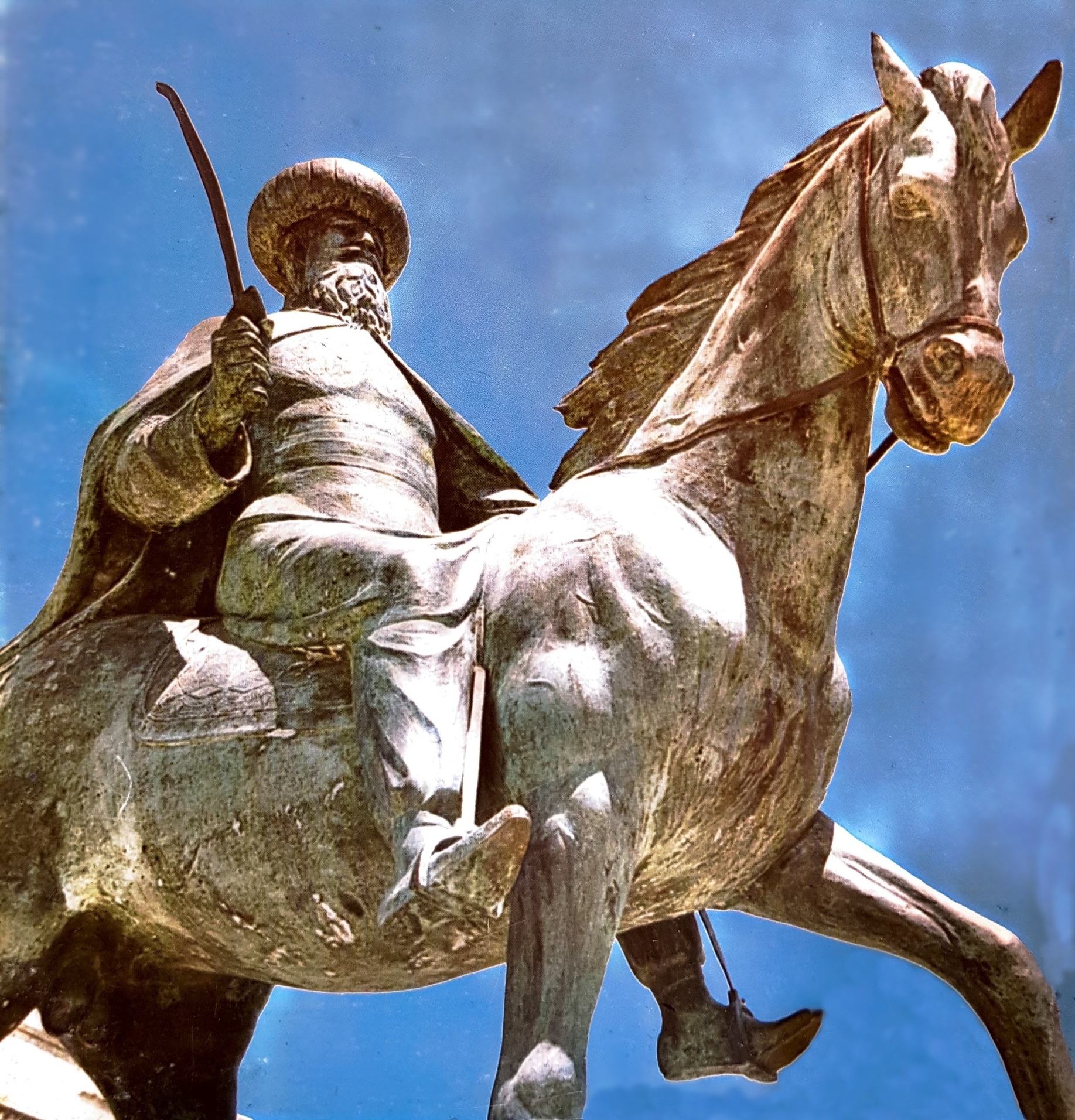
A statue of Fakhr al-Din in the Druze town of Baaqlin in the Chouf

Under Fakhr al-Din's leadership, Maronite, Greek Orthodox, and Greek Catholic Christians began migrating to the Druze Mountain in large numbers; the devastation wrought on the Druze peasantry during the punitive government campaigns of the 16th century had probably caused a deficit of Druze farm labor for the Druze landowners, which was partly filled by the Christian migrants. Christians were settled in Druze villages by the Druze tribal chiefs in the days of Fakhr al-Din to stimulate agricultural production, centered on silk, and the chiefs donated land to the Maronite Church and monastic institutions to further facilitate Christian settlement. Fakhr al-Din made the first such donation in 1609. Although the Druze chiefs owned much of the Chouf lands on which the silk crop was grown, Christians dominated every other aspect of the silk economy there, including production, financing, brokerage to the markets of Sidon and Beirut, and its export to Europe. Fakhr al-Din's religious tolerance endeared him to the Christians living under his rule. According to Duwayhi,

Under Emir Fakhr al-Din the Christians could raise their heads high. They built churches, rode horses with saddles, wore turbans of fine muslin and belts with precious inlays, and carried jeweled rifles. Missionaries from Europe came and established themselves in Mount Lebanon. This was because his troops were Christians, and his stewards and attendants Maronites.

=== Nationalist historiography ===
Modern Lebanese historians from the country's different religious communities have interpreted Fakhr al-Din's emirate, or collection of tax farms, according to their own community's conception of the Lebanese state, generally omitting divergent views. Nationalist narratives by Lebanese Druze and Maronites agree on Fakhr al-Din's "decisive influence and contribution to Lebanon's history", according to the historian Yusri Hazran, though they differ significantly in determining Fakhr al-Din's motives and the historic significance of his rule. Druze authors describe him as the ideal ruler who strove to achieve strong domestic unity, build a prosperous economy, and free Lebanon politically from Ottoman oppression. Making the case that the Ma'nids worked toward Lebanon's integration into the Arab regional environment, the Druze authors generally de-emphasize his relations with Europe and portray his drive for autonomy as the first forerunning of the Arab nationalist movement. On the other hand, Maronite authors viewed the legacy of Fakhr al-Din as one of isolation from the Arab–Islamic milieu. Fakhr al-Din himself has been adopted by a number of Maronite nationalists as a member of the religious group, citing the refuge he may have taken with the Khazen family in the Keserwan during his adolescence, or claiming that he had embraced Christianity at his deathbed.

In the view of the historian Philip Hitti, Fakhr al-Din's "long career stood between Lebanon past and Lebanon future. It pointed to the Lebanese their destiny and established a clear-cut break between their country and Syria." According to the historian Christopher Stone, Fakhr al-Din was utilized by the Rahbani brothers in their Lebanese nationalist play, The Days of Fakhr al-Din, as "a perfect historical predecessor for Lebanon's Christian nationalism of the twentieth century".

=== Building works ===
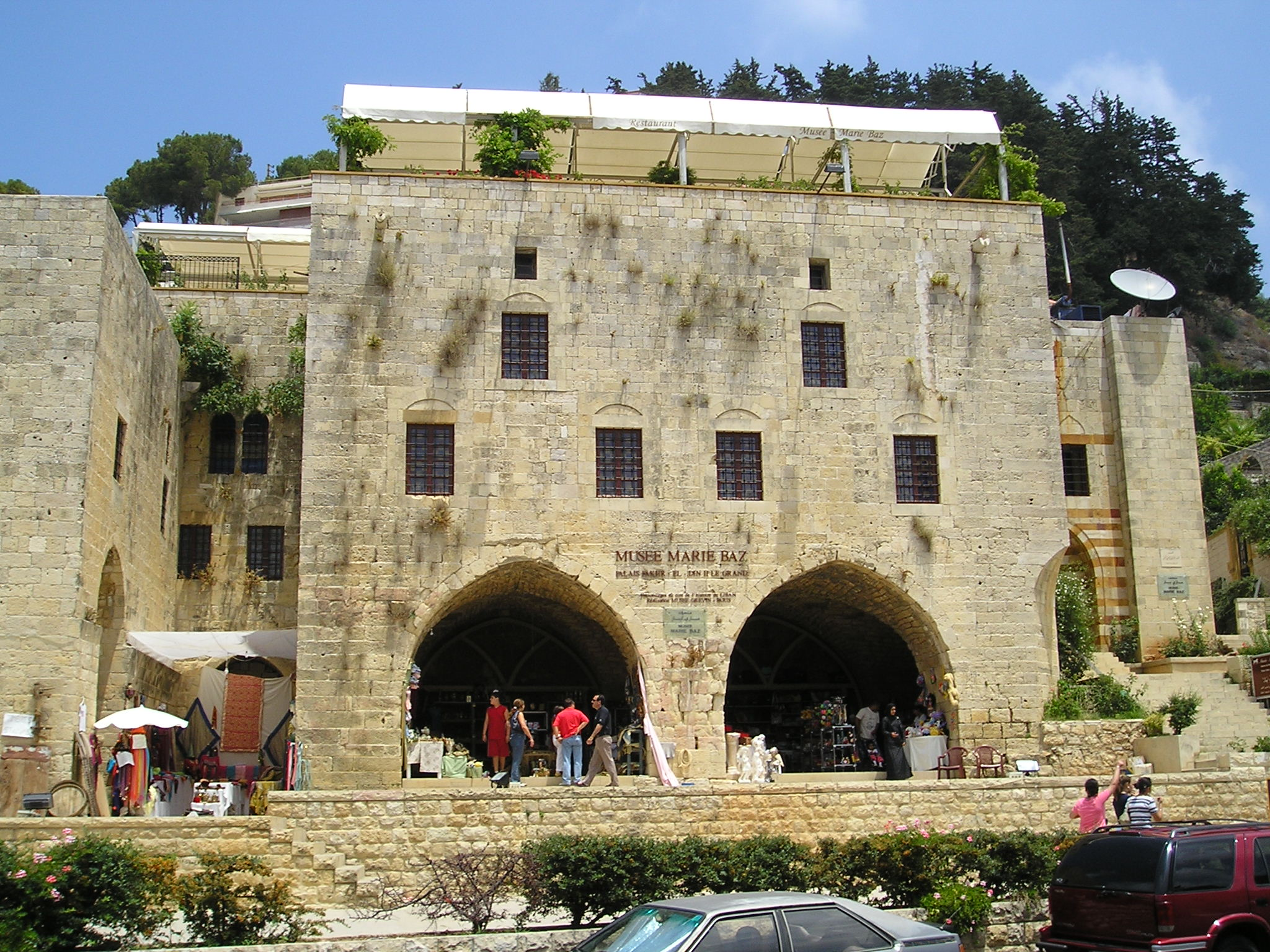
The saray in Deir al-Qamar (pictured in 2005), seat of the Ma'n under Fakhr al-Din

Toward the end of his career Fakhr al-Din requested assistance from the Medici in building modern fortifications in his territory. Tuscan experts, including the architect Francesco Cioli and the builder Francesco Fagni, arrived in Sidon in 1631. D'Arvieux noted that Fakhr al-Din had a significant interest in the arts, poetry, and music. Nonetheless, the modern historian Elie Haddad holds that his communications with Tuscany indicate that Fakhr al-Din's primary concern was utilitarian, namely the defense of his territory, facilitation of movement for his soldiers, and raising the living standards of the inhabitants.

Fakhr al-Din's palace in Beirut, possibly built by Cioli, combined Arabic and Tuscan architectural influences, and contained a marble fountain and extensive gardens. It was no longer extant by the end of the 19th century. Fakhr al-Din's palace in Deir al-Qamar was built in the Mamluk architectural style with little ornamentation, except its arched doorway entrance with its alternating yellow and white bands of limestone, a style known as ablaq.

Haddad assumes that Fagni oversaw the construction of water works and bridges at Nahr al-Kalb, Sidon, and Beirut, as well as the palace in Deir al-Qamar. Fakhr al-Din's building works in Sidon, Acre, and Deir al-Qamar "stand as a permanent tribute to the power and wealth that the Ma'ns achieved under his [Fakhr al-Din's] leadership and to their role in the re-emergence of the Levantine coast", according to Olsaretti.

==== Sidon ====
Fakhr al-Din had his government house—known as a saray—built in Sidon as early as 1598. It consisted of a large courtyard, an iwan on the ground floor, several rooms, including roofed reception areas known as qa'as, a fountain, and gardens. It was positioned immediately south of a large square in the city, today called 'Saray Square' after Fakhr al-Din's construction. Other than the entrance of the building, which is characterized by ablaq masonry and a type of ornamented vaulting known as muqarnas, the rest of the original structure had been gradually replaced through the early 19th century, when it was converted into a school; the courtyard is now a schoolyard and the garden is a playground. In its original form it was the tallest structure in Sidon and its garden had a wide variety of plants.

The expansion of commercial activity and increasing wealth in Sidon overseen by Fakhr al-Din is architecturally testified by his construction of the khans and mosques he built in the city. Fakhr al-Din is commonly, though erroneously, credited with the construction of the Khan al-Franj caravansary complex. It housed the French consul around 1616 until the consul relocated to a neighboring, formerly Ma'nid-owned property, the Dar al-Musilmani, in the 1630s. The Dar al-Musilmani was built by Fakhr al-Din, who may have used it as his original residence in the city and that of his wives. (Note: The Dar al-Musilmani was later administered by the brothers Mustafa and Ali Agha al-Hammud, who rented it out to French consuls as late as 1712. It is currently a school.) Following the capture of Fakhr al-Din by Kuchuk, the latter confiscated all of the Ma'ns' properties in Sidon, Tyre, Banias, and other places. (Note: Fakhr al-Din and his brother Yunus owned properties in Tyre, all confiscated by Kuchuk Ahmed Pasha, including a mulberry and fig orchard, a large residence, three mills, and a mulberry nursery.) He initially endowed the family's properties in Sidon, sixty-nine in total and mostly owned by Fakhr al-Din, his son Ali, and brother Yunus, in a waqf (religious trust) administered from Damascus for the benefit of the Islamic holy cities of Mecca and Medina. Among the properties were dozens of houses and shops, two khans, several mills, a soap factory, a coffeehouse, and a bathhouse (or hammam).

Fakhr al-Din's two khans in Sidon were the Khan al-Ruzz (the Caravansary of Rice) and the Khan al-Qaysariyya, both built directly on the Mediterranean shore of the old city. The first was observed by d'Arvieux as having large stores for the storage of rice and other commodities on the ground floor, a covered gallery for the rooms housing visitors on the top floor, a large courtyard, and a small mosque. Today, the Khan al-Ruzz is in a poor state, with the lower floor used for small workshops and the upper floor permanently housing Sidonian and Palestinian families, while the mosque has been replaced by a different structure. The smaller, neighboring Khan al-Qaysariyya, which abutted the Bahri Mosque, had a small, square courtyard with four stores, a second floor with a covered gallery leading to twelve rooms for visitors. D'Arvieux considered it the most beautiful of three khans of Sidon, including the Khan al-Franj. It is a sandstone structure and at present the courtyard has been built on, the lodging rooms and half of the stores have been subdivided and their structure changed. Two of the larger original stores of the Khan al-Qaysariyya remain intact and are used as shops. Fakhr al-Din built dozens of shops in the markets of Suq al-Ars and Suq al-Harir, around the three khans. A number of them continue to function in the Saray Square.

== Marriages and children ==
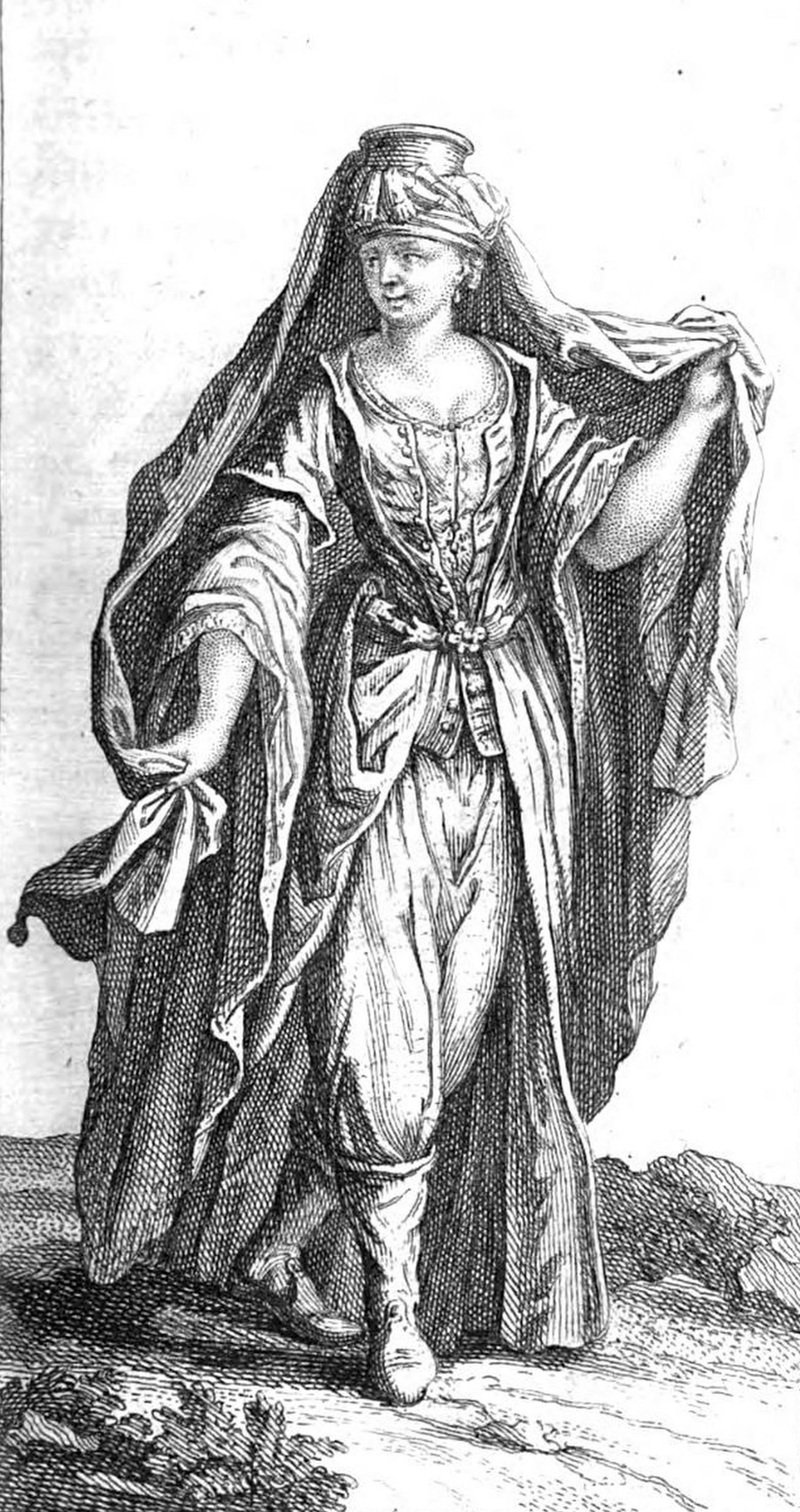
A fanciful 18th-century representation of a wife of Fakhr al-Din. The original is from d'Arvieux, 1718, p.258, describing customs among the Turabays, which he visited in on Mount Carmel in 1664.

Fakhr al-Din married at least four women. The sources generally omit their names, identifying them instead by their male relatives. His first wife was the sister of Muhammad ibn Jamal al-Din, a chief of the Arslans of Choueifat in the Gharb. The marriage was arranged c. 1590 by Fakhr al-Din's mother and uncle Sayf al-Din to reconcile tensions with the Yamani Druze faction of which the Arslans were part. She was known in the sources by the honorific term 'Sultana', as Sitt Nasab was also known. She gave birth to Fakhr al-Din's eldest son Ali. His second marriage was to a woman from the Qaysi Druze faction, to which the Ma'ns belonged, and nothing further is known about her.

In a series of peace settlements with the Sayfas, Fakhr al-Din established marital ties with the family. In 1613, he wed Alwa, a daughter of Yusuf's brother Ali Sayfa, who gave birth to his sons Husayn and Hasan in 1621 and 1624, respectively, and a daughter, Sitt al-Nasr. Sitt al-Nasr was married to Yusuf's son Hasan before 1618, and when Hasan died in 1623 she was remarried to his brother Umar in January 1624. Another of Fakhr al-Din's daughters was wed to Yusuf's son Beylik in 1620, while Fakhr al-Din's son Ali was wed to Yusuf's daughter in the same year. In 1617, one of Fakhr al-Din's daughters was officially wed to Ahmad, a son of Yunus al-Harfush who negotiated with the Ottomans on behalf of the Ma'ns to reinstate them as the sanjak-beys of Sidon-Beirut and Safad in 1615; the daughter was not sent to join Ahmad until December 1620. After Ahmad's death, she was married to his brother Husayn.

Fakhr al-Din's fourth wife was Khasikiyya bint Zafir, the sister of Fakhr al-Din's friend Ali al-Zafiri, who controlled Sidon before Fakhr al-Din's governorship. Known for her intelligence and beauty, she became his favorite wife. She continued to live in Sidon where Fakhr al-Din renovated a palace for her. She was the mother of his sons Haydar and Bulak, and daughter Fakhira. While Fakhr al-Din's other wives were sent for safety in Shaqif Arnun and Subayba, Khasikiyya accompanied him during his exile. She maintained social relations with the women of the Medici household, as indicated by a letter she sent to the Tuscan grand duchess Maria Maddalena in March 1616. Fakhr al-Din also had a concubine, who bore him his son Mansur.

== Family tree ==
Genealogical tree of the Ma'n dynasty and their relations with the Tanukh and Shihab dynasties
Paramount Emir of the Druze
Dynasties: Ma'n—Outlined in Black; Tanukh—Outlined in Red; Shihab—Outlined in Purple
Italic text denotes females
Dashed lines denote marriages

Ma'n d.1148? (Note: Salibi holds that information about the Ma'ns before Fakhr al-Din I is based on unverifiable local tradition. The date of Ma'ns death is sourced by this tradition.)
missed generations
Izz al-Din Sadaqa fl.1420s (Note: He was the first governor of Beirut appointed by the Mamluks from the Tanukh dynasty.)	Al-Hajj Yunus d.1470 (Note: He is mentioned in an inscription of the Deir al-Qamar Mosque as the father of Fakhr al-Din Uthman, also known as 'Fakhr al-Din I'. The date of his death is from the 19th-century historian from Mount Lebanon, Tannus al-Shidyaq, who erroneously calls him "Yusuf".)
missed generation
Fakhr al-Din Uthman d.1506 (Note: He is the first member of the Ma'n dynasty "whose historicity is beyond question", according to Salibi.)
Sayf al-Din Abu Bakr d.1492 (Note: According to the historian William Harris, Sayf al-Din Abu Bakr was the grandson of Izz al-Din Sadaqa and succeeded al-Sayyid al-Tanukhi as the spiritual leader of the Druze. Sayf al-Din's father, Izz al-Din's son, is not mentioned by name.)	Yunus d.1511/1512
Sharaf al-Din Yahya fl.1516–1518	Nasir al-Din Muhammad fl.1519–1567	Qurqumaz fl.1518–1528
Alam al-Din Sulayman	Yunus d.1556? (Note: The historian Abdul-Rahim Abu-Husayn theorizes that this Yunus was "possibly a son" of the preceding Qurqumaz and may have been the father of the next Qurqumaz (d. 1586), who was the father of Fakhr al-Din II. The Damascene poet Muhammad ibn Mami (d. 1579) indicates that a Druze chief named Yunus was executed by the Ottoman governor of Damascus, though no date is provided. The Italian historian Giovanni Minadoi (d. 1618) holds that the father of the Qurqumaz who died in 1586 was executed by the Ottomans, but neither provides a date nor the name of the father. The modern researcher Alexander Hourani, citing Ottoman government archives, claims the execution occurred in c. 1556.)
Mundhir fl.1556–1624 (Note: Mundhir ibn Alam al-Din Sulayman ibn Muhammad was a leading emir of the Tanukh and a tax farmer in the Gharb nahiya southeast of Beirut. Hourani argues that he was the grandson of Nasir al-Din Muhammad ibn Sayf al-Din Abu Bakr.)	Sayf al-Din fl.1585–1598 (Note: Although he is only referred to as 'Sayf al-Din' in the available sources, his given name and those of his father and grandfather being omitted, he is mentioned as the brother of Mundhir and Sitt Nasab.)	Sitt Nasab	Qurqumaz d.1586	Qasim fl.1574
Fakhr al-Din II d.1635	Yunus d.1633	Ali d.1633	Ahmad fl.1592–1633
Ali d.1633	Mansur d.1635	Hasan d.1633	Husayn d.1690 or 1697	Buluk d.1633	Haydar d.1633	Mulhim d.1658	Hamdan d.1633	Daughter	Qasim d.1633	Husayn d.1633
Qurqumaz d.1662	Ahmad d.1697	Daughter	Mansur d.1662	Bashir I d.1705
Mulhim d.1680	Daughter	Musa fl.1693
Haydar d.1732

== See also ==
- Daher al-Umar, semi-autonomous 18th-century ruler in northern Palestine and Sidon province

== Bibliography ==
- Abu-Husayn, Abdul-Rahim (1985). Provincial Leaderships in Syria, 1575–1650. Beirut: American University of Beirut. ISBN 978-0-8156-6072-9. OCLC 242675094.
- Abu-Husayn, Abdul-Rahim (November 1992). "Problems in the Ottoman Administration in Syria during the 16th and 17th Centuries: The Case of the Sanjak of Sidon-Beirut". International Journal of Middle East Studies. 24 (4): 665–675. doi:10.1017/S002074380002239X. JSTOR 164441. S2CID 159670509.
- Abu-Husayn, Abdul-Rahim (1993). "Khalidi on Fakhr al-Din: Apology as History". Al-Abhath. 41: 3–15. ISSN 0002-3973.
- Abu-Husayn, Abdul-Rahim (2001). "Education and Learning in Early Ottoman Palestine: An Overview (1516–1816)". In Ihsanoglu, Ekmeleddin (ed.). International Congress on Learning and Education in the Ottoman World: Istanbul, 12–15 April 1999. Istanbul: Research Centre for Islamic History, Art and Culture. pp. 297–304. ISBN 978-92-9063-092-0.
- Abu-Izzedin, Nejla M. (1993) [1984]. The Druzes: A New Study of Their History, Faith, and Society (2nd ed.). Leiden and New York: Brill. ISBN 90-04-09705-8.
- Bakhit, Muhammad Adnan Salamah (February 1972). The Ottoman Province of Damascus in the Sixteenth Century (PhD). London: School of Oriental and African Studies, University of London.
- Bulut, Mehmet (2001). Ottoman-Dutch Economic Relations in the Early Modern Period 1571–1699. Hilversum: Uitgeverij Verloren. ISBN 978-90-6550-655-9.
- Chehab, Hafez (1994). "Reconstructing the Medici Portrait of Fakhr al-Din Maʾani". Muqarnas. 11: 117–124. doi:10.2307/1523213. JSTOR 1523213.
- Griswold, William J. (1983). The Great Anatolian Rebellion, 1000–1020/1591–1611. Berlin: Klaus Schwarz. ISBN 3-922968-34-1.
- Haddad, Elie (2007). "Between Myth and Reality: the 'Tuscan Influence' on the Architecture of Mount Lebanon in the Emirate Period". Journal of Design History. 20 (2): 161–171. doi:10.1093/jdh/epm010. ISSN 0952-4649.
- Harris, William (2012). Lebanon: A History, 600–2011. New York: Oxford University Press. ISBN 978-0-19-518111-1.
- Hazran, Yusri (2014). The Druze Community and the Lebanese State: Between Confrontation and Reconciliation. London and New York: Routledge. ISBN 978-0-415-72549-1.
- Hitti, Philip K. (1965). A Short History of Lebanon. New York: St. Martin's Press. OCLC 1155509799.
- Hourani, Alexander (2010). New Documents on the History of Mount Lebanon and Arabistan in the 10th and 11th Centuries H. Beirut.
- Khairallah, Shereen (1996). The Sisters of Men: Lebanese Women in History. Beirut: Institute for Women Studies in the Arab World, Lebanese American University. OCLC 1012640574.
- Matar, Nabil (2009). Europe Through Arab Eyes, 1578–1727. New York: Columbia University Press. ISBN 978-0-231-14194-9.
- Olsaretti, Alessandro (December 2008). "Political Dynamics in the Rise of Fakhr al-Din, 1590–1633". The International History Review. 30 (4): 709–740. doi:10.1080/07075332.2008.10416646. ISSN 1949-6540. JSTOR 40213728. S2CID 153677447.
- Parry, V. J. (1976). "The Successors of Sulaimān, 1566–1617". In Cook, M. A. (ed.). A History of the Ottoman Empire to 1730. Cambridge: Cambridge University Press. pp. 103–132. ISBN 978-0-521-20891-8.
- Reilly, James A. (2016). The Ottoman Cities of Lebanon: Historical Legacy and Identity in the Modern Middle East. London: I. B. Tauris. ISBN 978-1-78672-036-8.
- Rondot, P. (1965). "Djānbulāt". In Lewis, B.; Pellat, Ch. & Schacht, J. (eds.). The Encyclopaedia of Islam, Second Edition. Volume II: C–G. Leiden: E. J. Brill. pp. 443–444. OCLC 495469475.
- Salibi, K. (1965). "Fakhr al-Dīn". In Lewis, B.; Pellat, Ch. & Schacht, J. (eds.). The Encyclopaedia of Islam, Second Edition. Volume II: C–G. Leiden: E. J. Brill. pp. 749–751. OCLC 495469475.
- Salibi, K. (February 1968). "The Muqaddams of Bšarrī: Maronite Chieftains of the Northern Lebanon 1382–1621". Arabica. 15 (1): 63–86. doi:10.1163/157005868X00280. JSTOR 4056124.
- Salibi, K. (1973a). "The Sayfās and the Eyalet of Tripoli 1579–1640". Arabica. 20 (1): 25–52. doi:10.1163/15700585-02001004. ISSN 0570-5398. JSTOR 4056003. S2CID 247635304.
- Salibi, K. (1973b). "The Secret of the House of Ma'n". International Journal of Middle East Studies. 4 (3): 272–287. doi:10.1017/S0020743800031469. JSTOR 162160. S2CID 163020137.
- Salibi, K. (1991). "Maʿn". In Bosworth, C. E.; van Donzel, E. & Pellat, Ch. (eds.). The Encyclopaedia of Islam, Second Edition. Volume VI: Mahk–Mid. Leiden: E. J. Brill. pp. 343–344. ISBN 978-90-04-08112-3.
- Salibi, K. (2005). A House of Many Mansions: The History of Lebanon Reconsidered. London: I.B. Tauris. ISBN 978-1-86064-912-7.
- Stone, Christopher (2008). Popular Culture and Nationalism in Lebanon: The Fairouz and Rahbani Nation. Abingdon, Oxon and New York: Routledge. ISBN 978-0-415-77273-0.
- Weber, S. (2010). "The Making of an Ottoman Harbour Town: Sidon/Saida from the Sixteenth to the Eighteenth Centuries". In Sluglett, Peter; Weber, Stefan (eds.). Syria and Bilad al-Sham under Ottoman rule: Essays in Honour of Abdul-Karim Rafeq. Leiden and Boston: Brill. pp. 179–240. ISBN 978-90-04-18193-9.
- Winter, Stefan (2010). The Shiites of Lebanon under Ottoman Rule, 1516–1788. Cambridge: Cambridge University Press. ISBN 978-0-521-76584-8.
