= Al-Khalidi al-Safadi =

Ottoman historian and mufti

Aḥmad ibn Muḥammad al-Khālidī al-Safadī (died 1625) was an Ottoman historian and the Hanafi mufti of Safed c. 1600–1625. He was best known for being the adviser of the powerful Druze chief and tax farmer Fakhr al-Din II after the latter was appointed governor of Safad Sanjak in 1602 and for chronicling Fakhr al-Din's career. His book is an important contemporary source of Fakhr al-Din's life and for the history of Lebanon and Palestine under Ottoman rule during his lifetime.

== Life ==
Khalidi was a Sunni Muslim native of Safad. He received his religious education at al-Azhar in Cairo and afterward became the mufti of the Hanafi fiqh (school of Islamic jurisprudence) of his hometown. The Hanafi fiqh was the school of law of Ottoman officialdom. After the appointment of Fakhr al-Din, a Druze emir from Mount Lebanon and the sanjak-bey (district governor) of Sidon-Beirut, to the governorship of Safad in 1602, Khalidi became his adviser. He further acted as Fakhr al-Din's court historian.

== Works ==
One of his most important works was the highly informative account of Fakhr al-Din's career, Tarikh al-Amir Fakhr al-Din al-Ma'ni (The History of Emir Fakhr al-Din al-Ma'ni). It was likely written upon Fakhr al-Din's request in an effort to explain his loyalty to the Ottomans through his Hanafi mufti. Khalidi had often used his connections with the ulema (religious scholars) of Damascus to mediate between Fakhr al-Din and the beylerbeys (provincial governors) of Damascus, of which Safad and Sidon-Beirut were part.

The Ottoman biographers of Khalidi did not mention the work, probably due to its irrelevance as an apologetic for Fakhr al-Din after his arrest and execution in 1633 and 1635, or the biographers' embarrassment to copy or acknowledge the generally positive account of Fakhr al-Din, who was viewed in Damascene Ottoman circles as a rebel and tyrant. The original manuscripts were mostly preserved by Maronite scribes and families in Mount Lebanon sympathetic to Fakhr al-Din. There is also an original manuscript preserved in Munich. The manuscripts were edited and published under the title Lubnan fi ahd al-Amir Fakhr al-Din al-Ma'ni al-Thani by Asad Rustum and Fuad Bustani in Beirut in 1936.

Khalidi's book is an important contemporary source for the history of Lebanon and Palestine. A supplement of this book includes Khalidi's purported observations of Europe from his time in Florence in exile with Fakhr al-Din. If authentic, it would represent one of the earliest Ottoman Arab first-hand accounts of Europe, its educational system, banking, agriculture and printing press; the historian Abdul-Rahim Abu-Husayn considers its authenticity to be "doubtful".

Khalidi was also a distinguished Arabic poet and linguist, as indicated by his surviving poetry. His other, earlier important work was Tawq al-Hamamah fi al-Nasab li Muluk al-Ajam wa al-Arab (The Ring of the Dove in the Genealogy of the Persian and Arab Kings), which is unpublished. He also penned a commentary of the seminal 13th-century Arabic grammar book Alfiyyat Ibn Malik, wrote a book on metrics, and accounts of his travels.

== Bibliography ==
- Abu-Husayn, Abdul-Rahim (1993). "Khalidi on Fakhr al-Din: Apology as History". Al-Abhath. 41: 3–15.
- Abu-Husayn, Abdul-Rahim (1999). "The Junblats and the Janbulads: A Case of Mistaken Identity". In Köhbach, Markus; Procházka-Eisl, Gisela; Römer, Claudia (eds.). Acta Viennensia Ottomanica: Proceedings of the 13th CIEPO-Symposiums, from 21 to 25 September 1998. Vienna: Selbrstverlag des Instituts fur Orientalistik. pp. 1–6. ISBN 9783900345051.
- Abu-Husayn, Abdul-Rahim (2001). "Education and Learning in Early Ottoman Palestine: An Overview (1516-1816)". In Ihsanoglu, Ekmeleddin (ed.). International Congress on Learning and Education in the Ottoman World: Istanbul, 12-15 April 1999. Istanbul: Research Centre for Islamic History, Art and Culture. pp. 297–304. ISBN 978-92-9063-092-0.
