= Khan al-Franj =

Ottoman caravanserai in Sidon, Lebanon

Coordinates: 33.5642°N 35.3698°E

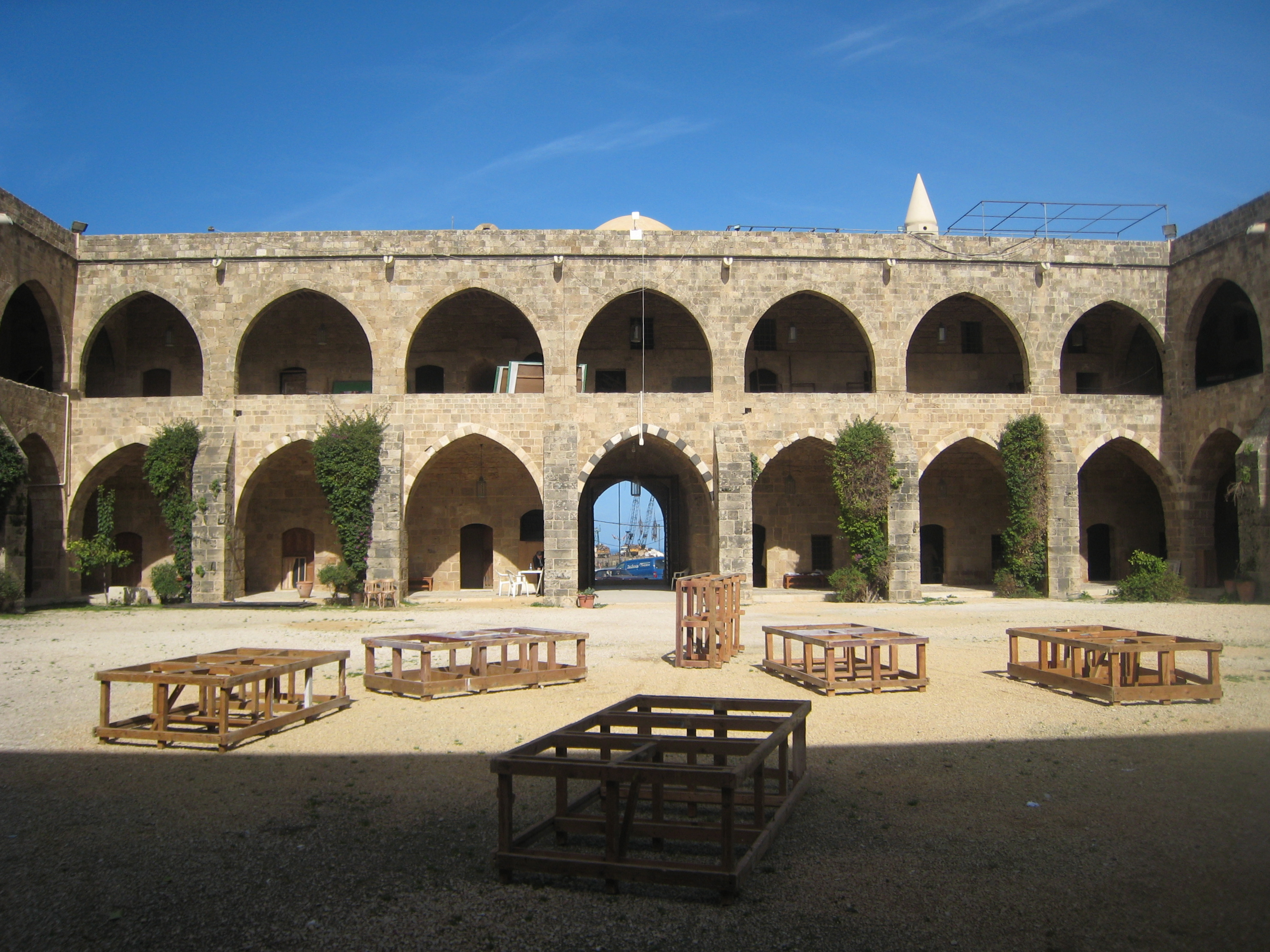
Khan al-Franj, 2009

Khan al-Franj (Arabic: خان الفرنج) is an Ottoman caravanserai in Sidon, Lebanon. The founding of the structure is traditionally attributed to the Druze emir Fakhr al-Din II, but its construction was ordered earlier, in the late 16th century by Grand Vizier Sokullu Mehmed Pasha. Its name is owed to the French (called al-Franj in Arabic) merchants it housed in the 17th century. It currently functions as a cultural center and is owned by the French government, which has leased it to the Hariri Foundation.

== History ==
The construction of Khan al-Franj is commonly, though erroneously attributed to the Druze emir and governor of Sidon Eyalet, Fakhr al-Din II. The complex's actual founder was Grand Vizier Sokollu Mehmed Pasha (d. 1579). It received its modern name, which translates as "Caravansary of the Franks", from its French mercantile occupants in the 17th century. It housed the French consul around 1616 until the consul relocated to a neighboring property, formerly owned by Fakhr al-Din's Ma'n family, the Dar al-Musilmani, in the 1630s.

== Architecture ==
The khan features a large rectangular courtyard with a central fountain, surrounded by covered galleries. This layout is characteristic of many khans of the era, which served as inns for merchants and travelers.

== Restoration and current use ==
Khan al-Franj is currently a cultural center owned by the French Government. In recent years, the Hariri Foundation leased Khan al-Franj for 35 years, committing to its restoration. The Foundation's efforts have preserved the building, although restoration is ongoing. It functions mainly as a cultural center, helping to protect its structure from major alterations. The restoration project has also inspired further restoration initiatives targeting historical monuments in Sidon.

== Bibliography ==
- Al-hagla, Khalid S. (2010). "Sustainable Urban Development in Historical Areas using the Tourist Trail Approach: A Case Study of the Cultural Heritage and Urban Development (CHUD) project in Saida, Lebanon". Cities. 27 (4): 234–248. doi:10.1016/j.cities.2010.02.001.
- Weber, S. (2010). "The Making of an Ottoman Harbour Town: Sidon/Saida from the Sixteenth to the Eighteenth Centuries". In Sluglett, Peter; Weber, Stefan (eds.). Syria and Bilad al-Sham under Ottoman rule: Essays in Honour of Abdul-Karim Rafeq. Leiden and Boston: Brill. pp. 179–240. ISBN 978-90-04-18193-9.
