= Hisah =

Hisah الحيصة
- Village
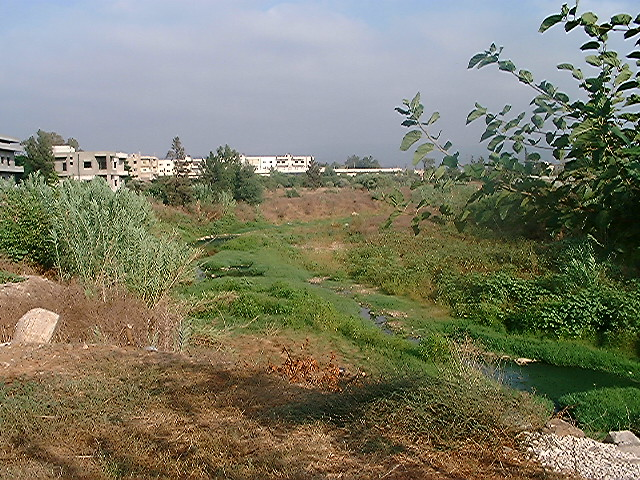
- River by Hisah

- Location within Lebanon
- Coordinates: 34°35′47″N 36°3′17″E
- Country: Lebanon
- Governorate: Akkar
- District: Akkar

Area
  - Total: 2.10 km^{2} (0.81 sq mi)
- Elevation: 30 m (98 ft)

Population (2009)
  - Total: 1,756 eligible voters
  - Density: 836/km^{2} (2,170/sq mi)
- Time zone: UTC+2 (EET)
  - Summer (DST): UTC+3 (EEST)
- Dialing code: +961

Hisah (Arabic: الحيصة, romanized: al-Ḥayṣah), also spelled Hokr el Haïssa, Haysa, Hayssa, El Haïssa or Hisa, is a northern Lebanese village in the Akkar Governorate, close to the Syrian border. It is mostly inhabited by Alawites and Sunni Muslims.

== History ==
The history of the village goes back to the days of the Banu Hilal tribe, and it is named after the horse of Abu-Zayd al-Hilali.

In the late 1620s or early 1630s, the Druze strongman of and Ottoman governor Fakhr al-Din II planted a large grove of mulberry trees in Hisah, as well as Tripoli, as part of his efforts to stimulate the burgeoning silk industry of Mount Lebanon.

In 1838, Eli Smith noted the village, whose inhabitants were Alawites, located west of esh-Sheikh Mohammed.

During the 2006 Lebanon War, a bridge in the village was bombed by Israeli planes, leaving up to 12 people dead.

== Demographics ==
In 2014, Muslims made up 99.23% of registered voters in Hisah. 50.61% of the voters were Alawites and 47.20% were Sunni Muslims.

== Bibliography ==
- Robinson, E.; Smith, E. (1841). Biblical Researches in Palestine, Mount Sinai and Arabia Petraea: A Journal of Travels in the year 1838. Vol. 3. Boston: Crocker & Brewster.
