= Niha, Chouf =

Niha نيحا
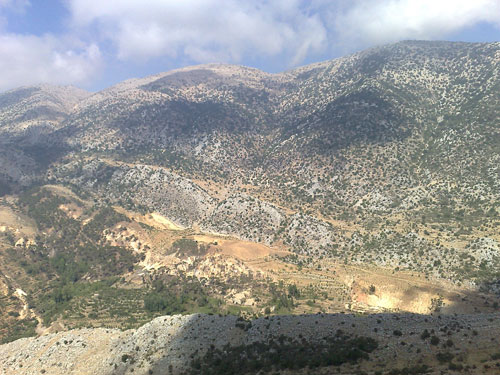
- Niha City

- Location in Lebanon
- Coordinates: 33°35′46″N 35°37′30″E
- Country: Lebanon
- Governorate: Mount Lebanon Governorate
- District: Chouf District
- Elevation: 335 ft (102 m)

Population
  - Total: 6,500
- Time zone: UTC+2 (EET)
  - Summer (DST): +3

Niha (Arabic: نيحا, romanized: Nīḥā [ˈniħa]) is a town in the Chouf which belongs to Mount Lebanon of Lebanon. The town is 44 miles from Beirut and it has about 3,750 hectares; there are 6,500 inhabitants of Druze and Christian. However, there are only two public schools in the city. It is famous because of its olive groves and its grapes, apples, plums and almonds production. Its tourist attractions are The church of Saint Joseph, El Qa'ah Spring, Job's tomb and Niha's Castle. Like all Lebanon's corners, Niha owns a cultural or historical richness that dwells in the heritage of the country. Lebanese singer Wadih El Safi was born in Niha. The population speaks Lebanese Arabic.

== Etymology ==
The name Niha is used by four Lebanese cities: Niha, Zahlé; Niha, Batroun; Niha, Tyre and Niha, Chouf. The word neeha is Syriac and denotes to the place the character of calm, peaceful.

== History ==
It is believed that Niha is the place where biblical character Job lived temporarily during the period before and through his healing miracle. Thus there is a relatively modern structure located in a hill overlooking Niha town in the Chouf that is supposed to be the burial site of Job and the site in which he performed his renowned miracle. The domed shrine of Job with arched courtyards and terraces constitutes most of the site, surrounded by a small cave and mountainous landscapes and green woods.

Moreover, Niha is one of the most known destinations in the area, with many caves, both natural and man-made. One among them, a cave-fortress that was cut into a cliff during the Crusades between 1165 and 1260, is named Niha's Castle or Shakif Tiron. According to the popular tale prince Fakhreddine El Ma'ani II hid there when hiding from the Ottomans in 1635. However, the accurate historic version links these events to prince's father Korkomaz during 1584.

In 1776, Ali al-Zahir, a nephew of Zahir al-Umar, was expelled from his strong-hold of Deir Hanna by Cezayirli Gazi Hasan Pasha. After this, Ali al-Zahir took refuge in Niha. In 1838, Eli Smith noted Niha as a village, part of Esh-Shuf el-Haity, located in Aklim esh-Shuf, north of Jezzin.

== Tourist attractions ==
- Druze Prophet Job shrine مقام النبي أيوب
- Niha's Castle قلعة نيحا
- Saint George church كنيسة مار جرجس
- Saint Joseph church كنيسة مار يوسف
- Mysterious sarcophagus نواويس
- El Qa'ah Spring عين القاعة

== See also ==
- Druze in Lebanon
- Christianity in Lebanon

== Bibliography ==
- Debenham, Frank (1972). "El Atlas de nuestro tiempo", The Reader's Digest Association Limited, London, 241
- Robinson, E.; Smith, E. (1841). Biblical Researches in Palestine, Mount Sinai and Arabia Petraea: A Journal of Travels in the year 1838. Vol. 3. Boston: Crocker & Brewster.
- Sharon, M. (2004). Corpus Inscriptionum Arabicarum Palaestinae, D-F. Vol. 3. BRILL. ISBN 90-04-13197-3.
