= Double Qaim-Maqamate of Mount Lebanon =

Subdivision of the Ottoman Empire from 1843 to 1861

Double Qaim-Maqamate of Mount Lebanon قَائِم مَقَامِيَّتَي جَبَل لُبْنَان
- 1843–1861
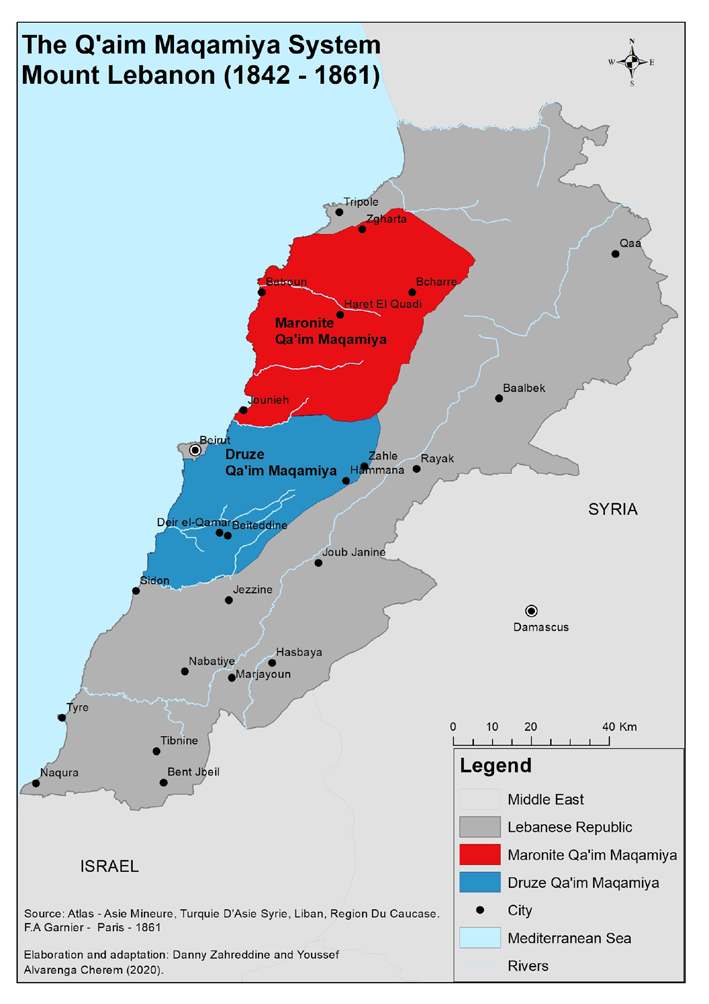
- The Double Qaim-Maqamate overlaid on the modern boundaries of Lebanon
- Historical era: 19th century
  - Established: 1843
  - Disestablished: 1861
Preceded by	Succeeded by
Mount Lebanon Emirate	Mount Lebanon Mutasarrifate
- Today part of: Lebanon

The Double Qaim-Maqamate of Mount Lebanon (1843–1861, Arabic: قَائِم مَقَامِيَّتَي جَبَل لُبْنَان, romanized: Qāʾim maqāmiyyatay jabal lubnān, or simply, اَلْقَائِم مَقَامِيَّتَيْن; Al-Qāʾim maqāmiyyatayn, lit. 'The Double Qaim-Maqamate') was one of the Ottoman Empire's subdivisions following the abolishment of the Mount Lebanon Emirate. After 1843, Mount Lebanon was administered through Christian and Druze subdivisions whom were established following the violence of 1841 and negotiations between European and Ottoman representatives. After the collapse of the Double Qaim-Maqamate due to the 1860 conflict, the Maronite Catholics and the Druze further developed the idea of an independent Lebanon in the mid-nineteenth century, through the creation of the Mount Lebanon Mutasarrifate.

The division of Mount Lebanon between Christians and Druze was proposed by the Austrian Chancellor Metternich as a compromise between the British and the Ottomans, who backed the Druze demand for a Druze governor, and the French, who insisted on the return of the Shihab principality. Thus, the Druze emir Ahmad Arslan was appointed qāʾim maqām of the mixed southern district and Christian emir Haydar Ahmad Abu al-Lamaʿ qāʾim maqām of the mostly Christian northern district, each qāʾim maqām was to be accompanied by two wakils, a Druze and a Christian, who exercised their judicial and fiscal authority over the members of their respective communities

The declaration of the Qāʾim Maqāmiyya triggered a wave of violence and further worsened the religious tensions, a series of overlapping and complicated conflicts dominated the years that followed its declaration, with Christian commoners fighting against both Christian and Druze feudal lords, and bad weather controlling the region in 1856–1858, alongside a crisis in silk production which cut the production of the valuable product in Mount Lebanon to a half, led to several peasant's revolts that ultimately caused the climax of the tensions between the Druze and the Maronites. Subsequently, the Mount Lebanon conflict of 1860 began and led to the demise of the Double Qaim-maqamate.

== Background ==
The emir Bashir III did not care about the demands of the Druze, as he refused to extract the land from the new owners who bought it from the previous emir during the Egyptian occupation, and he was not satisfied with that, but stripped a number of other feudal lords of their remaining privileges in collecting taxes, maintaining security in their areas, and exercising judicial authority. The violences of 1841 were underpined by disputes over land, taxation and by conflicting understandings of political restoration: returning Druze notables sought restitution of their original rights, while Maronite villagers demanded protection, equality and resisted renewed vassalage.

Usually, in these types of incidents, sheikhs and the ʿuqalā (the Druze religious elite) would intervene to solve it, and if they were not successful, they would raise the matter to the emir, who would issue his ruling and restore things to normal, but anxiety and tension among the population and the emir being unable to impose his will on a party that does not recognize him prevented such solutions. The conflict moved to some areas in the Beqaa Valley, and it reached its climax when some Druze besieged the emir in the Deir al-Qamar Palace and then stormed him and arrested the emir and mistreated him. The Ottomans seized this opportunity and dealt their final blow. On 13 December 1842, that is, three months after the start of the unrest, the governor of Beirut summoned Prince Bashir III from Deir al-Qamar to Beirut, from which an Ottoman ship took him to Constantinople.

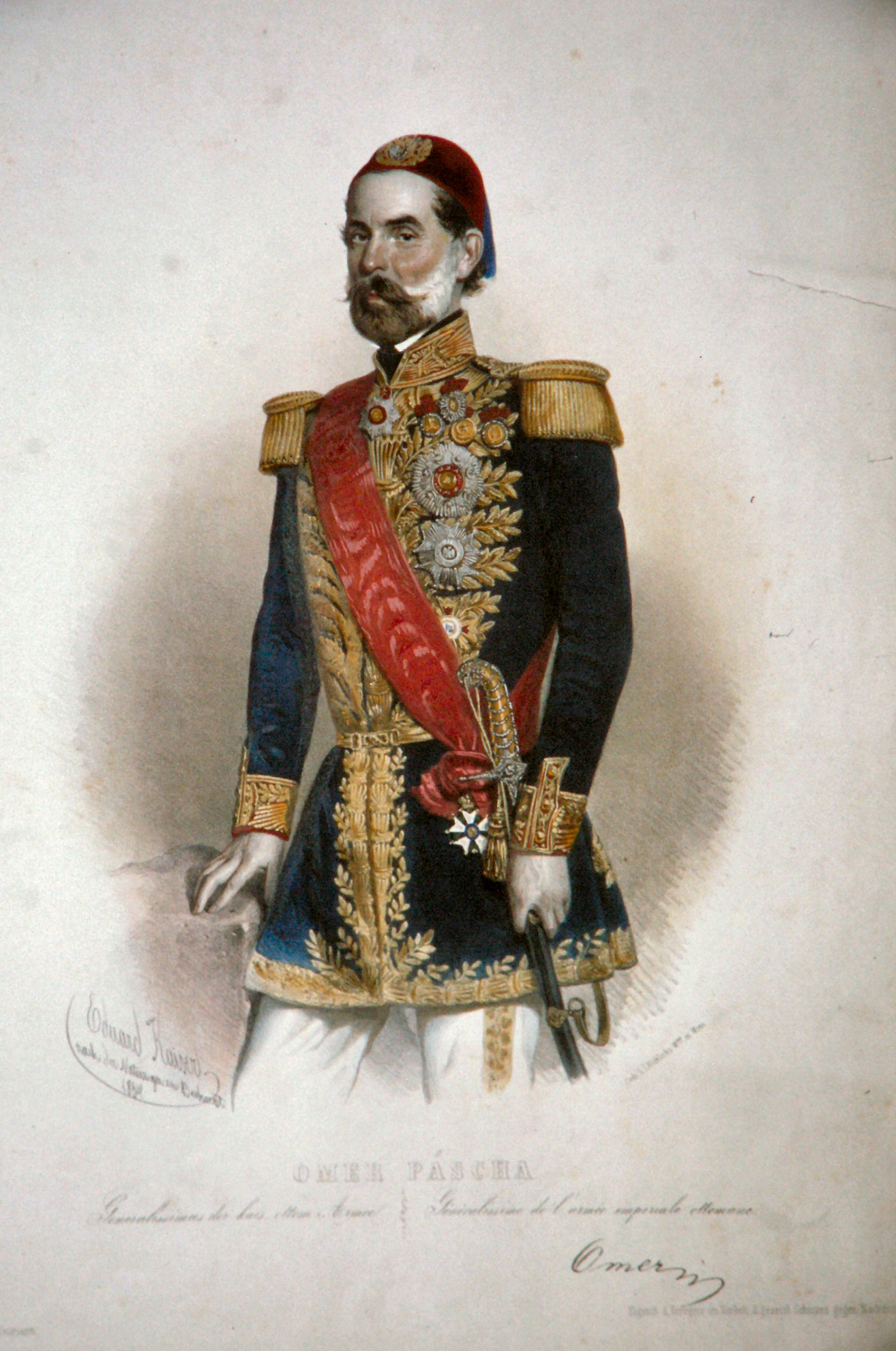
Omar Pasha – Lithograph

After the removal of Prince Bashir III, the Lebanese Shehab emirate, which had been the ruling entity of the country and its population for many years, collapsed. The Ottomans appointed one of the most senior officials as direct ruler on the mountain, with the ruler being a Sunni Muslim of Austrian origins named Omar Pasha, the Druze welcomed him and the Christians rejected him, and the majority of the Christians stood by the Maronite Patriarch Youssef Boutros Hobeish, who announced that he refused to cooperate with any non-Lebanese ruler or any ruler not chosen by the Lebanese themselves. The Pasha had hired agents to edit petitions that showed the people's support for him and their refusal to return to the Chehab rule. A number of people signed these petitions in exchange for a bribe, a promise or a threat, and some of them signed them with consent, when the matter of the petitions was exposed in Constantinople and the Porte got determined to dismiss the Austrian, the Pasha tried to lure the Druze to him and persuade them to fight the Christians population, but the Druze, feeling that the Pasha had taken advantage of them, led forces against him and almost stormed his palace, had it not been for a battalion of the Ottoman soldiers had rescued him, then he was sent to Beirut, where he was dismissed from his position, on the same day, the Porte and representatives of European countries reached in Constantinople a new project to govern Mount Lebanon, and to be implemented in early 1843.

== History ==
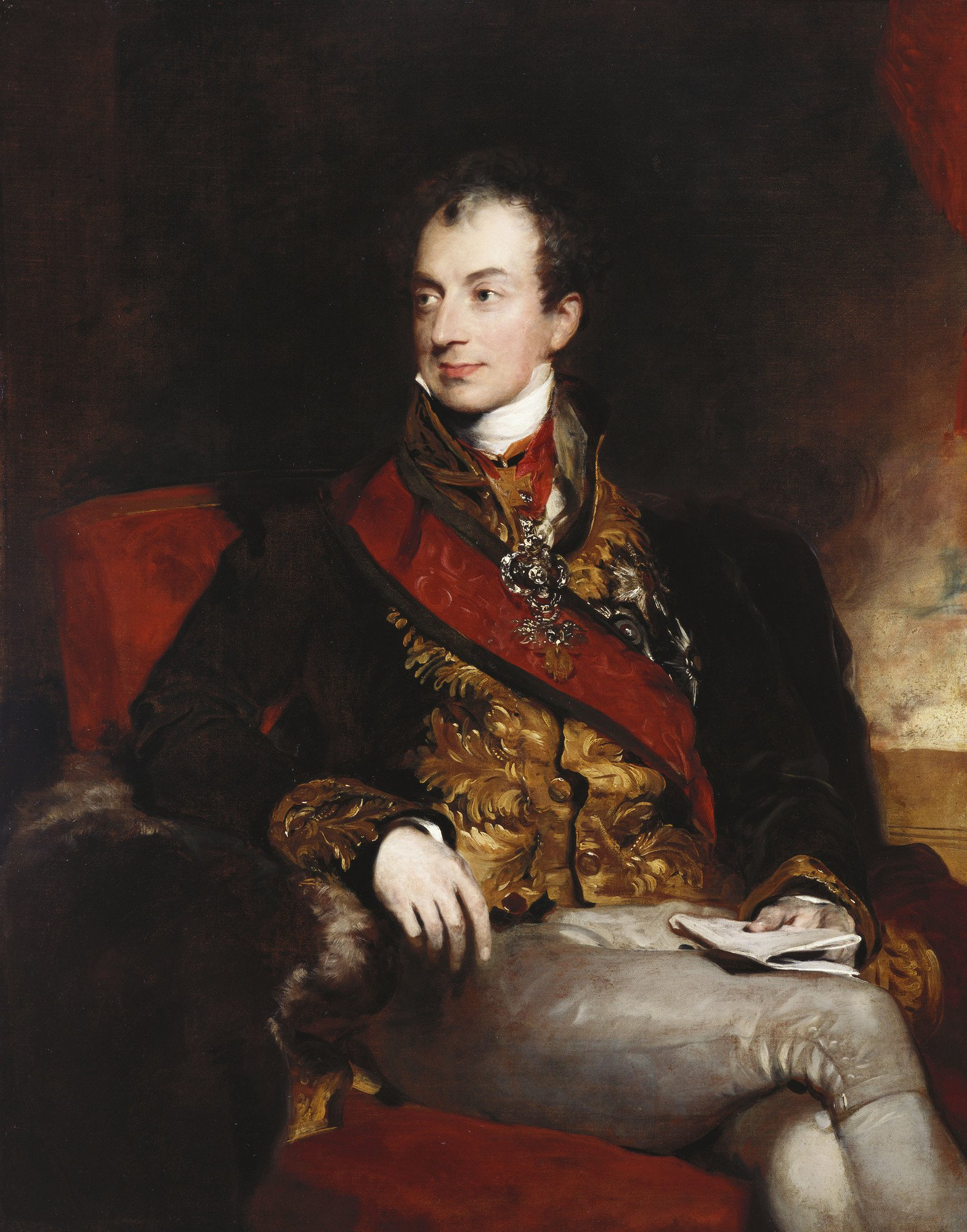
Klemens von Metternich, architect of the Kaimakamat System.

After dismissing Omar Pasha of his position, the Ottoman government tried to appoint two non-Lebanese Ottoman rulers in his place, one on the south of the mountain, that is, on the Druze-majority side, and the other on the north of the mountain, that is, on the Christian-majority side, with the rulers being the subject of the Governor of Beirut, but the Europeans stood in the way of the Ottoman plan, as it entailed strengthening the Ottoman Islamic grip on Mount Lebanon, and since the influence of the Ottoman Empire was weakening at the time and unable to compete with the European influence, the Sultan accepted the proposals of representatives of the great powers to divide the mountain into a Christian and a Druze side and on 1 December 1843, the Sultan agreed to the proposal of Klemens von Metternich, Chancellor of the Austrian Empire, and asked Asaad Pasha, the governor of Beirut, to divide Mount Lebanon into two provinces: a northern province ruled by a Christian Qa’im-Maqam and a southern province governed by a Druze Qa’im-Maqam, both of whom are chosen by the notables, and are subject to the Governor of Beirut, this system was later known as the double Qa’im-Maqamate system. European diplomats advocated for partition along religious lines, but Ottoman officials initially opposed the proposal due to their belief that Mount Lebanon's population was too mixed for an effective territorial division. Indeed, the southern district designated as Druze also contained a Christian majority outside the Shuf.

== Troubles of 1845–1858 ==
The defects of the double Qa’im-Maqamate system became clear when sectarian strife continued under it, the reason for this is that this system not only failed to eliminate the causes of discord among the inhabitants of the mountain, but also added to it a new factor of discrimination and conflict, the factor being the class struggle between the feudal lords and the common people, after taking away from the Druze and Christian feudal leaders their judicial and financial powers, and making them the prerogative of the qāʾim maqām and the Qāʾim maqām Council. In the year 1856, Sultan Abdulmejid I issued his famous firman, in which he equalized all Ottoman subjects, regardless of their different religious beliefs, and abolished the political and social privileges enjoyed by a group or a sect. The Christians were at the forefront of those adhering to the provisions of this decree, as they constituted most of the peasants and the majority of the working class consisted of them. The peasants in the Christian areas, led by Tanyus Shahin, revolted against the feudal lords and burned their palaces and robbed their crops. Then the movement of revolution spread to the south of Mount Lebanon, where the farmers were a mixture of Druze and Christians, however, at that time, confidence was already lost between the two parties, making it impossible to unite the word of the peasants of the two communities for their common interest against their feudal leaders. The Druze feudal leaders took advantage of religious ties, and they convinced their peasants of their own sect that conflict between them and the Christians exists and that they could not be trusted, and urged them to support their leaders and rally around them to defend their followers of their faith.

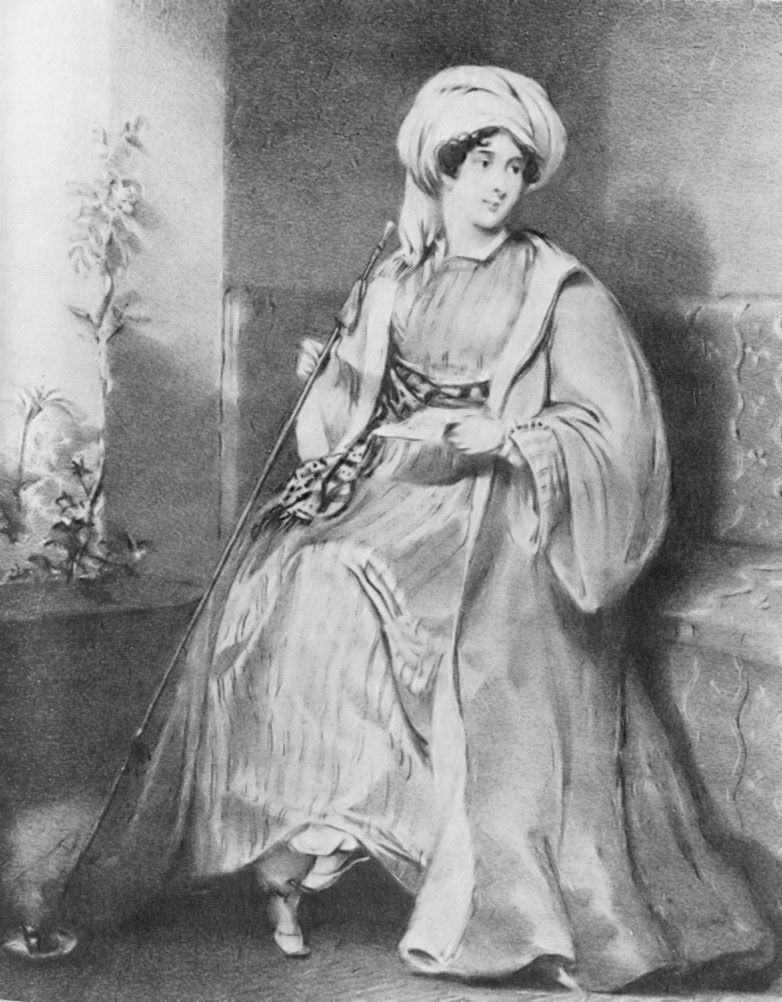
Lady Hester Lucy Stanhope, a British orientalist who lived for 29 years in Mount Lebanon and had a prominent role in igniting the Druze revolt against the Egyptians and fueling sectarian hatred between the Druze and Christians.

Foreign countries played a major role in worsening sectarian hatreds. The British, after their Protestant missionaries were unable to win a large audience of native Lebanese Christians, supported and encouraged the Druze and supplied them with money and weapons, as did the French for the Maronites, with most of Britain and France's agents being Orientalists who spent many years in the Levant. For all of these reasons, the atmosphere in Mount Lebanon had become filled with tensions between the Maronites and the Druze, and was liable to explode at any moment for the most trivial of reasons.

== Fall ==
=== 1860 civil war ===
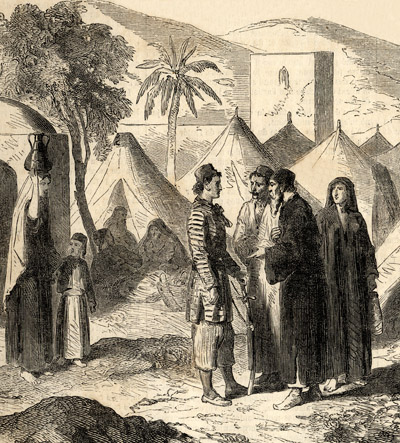
Christian refugees during the 1860 strife

The events of this civil war began in the summer of 1859, with a simple dispute over a game of Gelleh (Marbles) between a Druze and a Maronite kid in the town of Beit Meri, the parents of each of the kids participated in the dispute, and it turned into a bloody quarrel in which the people of the two sects from Beit Meri, then from all the villages of Matn, participated. The fighting got reignited on 22 May 1860, when a small group of Maronites fired on a group of Druze at the entrance to Beirut, killing one and wounding two. This sparked a torrent of violence which swept through Lebanon. In a mere three days, from 29 to 31 May 60 villages were destroyed in the vicinity of Beirut. 33 Christians and 48 Druze were killed. By June, the disturbances had spread to the "mixed" neighbourhoods of southern Lebanon and the Anti Lebanon, to Sidon, Hasbaya, Rashaya, Deir el Qamar, and Zahlé. The Druze peasants laid siege to Catholic monasteries and missions, burnt them, and killed the monks. France intervened on behalf of the local Christian population and Britain on behalf of the Druze after the massacres, in which over 10,000 Christians were killed.

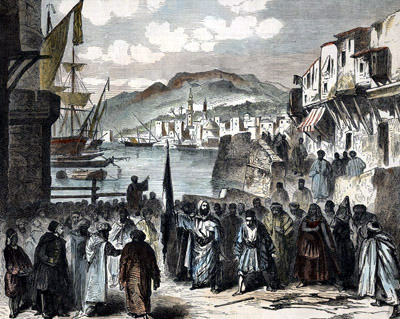
Beirut in 1860, in the center of the picture is Emir Abd al-Qadir al-Jaza'iri, who had come to help end the conflict between the Druze and the Christians.

The number of dead reached twelve thousand, and the Druze were the fiercest fighters, it was said that out of the 12,000 dead, 10,000 of them were Christians. Property losses were estimated at four million golden pound sterlings, and the strife occurred during the silk season, which was the mainstay of the Levantine economy in general and the Lebanese mountainous economy in particular, the war destroyed it and eliminated it, and many Christian craftsmen emigrated from Damascus, fearing for their lives, leading to the dramatic decline of the famous Damascene steel industry. The violence of the sedition was mitigated by inter-religious support, with the Druze Banu Talhouq defending Christian monks and sheltering them in their homes, and some Christians remained in the protection of the Druze sheikhs, safe from any harm that might befall on them. In Damascus, Emir Abd al-Qadir al-Jaza’iri protected the Christians, sheltering them in his house and in a citadel, he also took advantage of his influence in Beirut to protect them, Muslim clerics and a number of Beirut notables opened their homes to the afflicted Maronites, as did the Shiite leaders in Jabal Amel.

When Sultan Abd al-Majid I feared that this sedition would lead to the military intervention of foreign countries in the Ottoman affairs, he instructed the Ottoman officials in Beirut and Damascus to put the civil war down immediately, and at the same time he dispatched the Minister of Foreign Affairs, Fuad Pasha, who was known for his cunning and firmness, and who gave him absolute powers, to deal with the situation. With his mission succeeding, he executed most of those who caused the massacres, imprisoned the rest, exiled some of them, returned some of the war booty to their afflicted Christian owners, and collected many donations, which he spent on restoring villages. The major European countries pressured the Sultan and urged him to accept the formation of an international committee entrusted with restoring stability to Mount Lebanon, liquidating the sedition, and setting up a new system of governance. Thus, the reign of the double Qa’im-Maqamate ended in the year 1861, after it lasted for nineteen years.

== List of qaimaqams ==
Christian qaimaqams

- Haydar abi-Lamaʿ (1843–1854)
- Bashir Ahmad abi-Lamaʿ (1854–1859)
- Hassan abi-Lamaʿ (1859–1860)
- Youssef Bey Karam (1860–1861)

Druze qaimaqams

- Ahmad Arslan (1843–1844)
- Amin Arslan (1844–1859)
- Muhammed Arslan (1859–1861)

== Maps ==
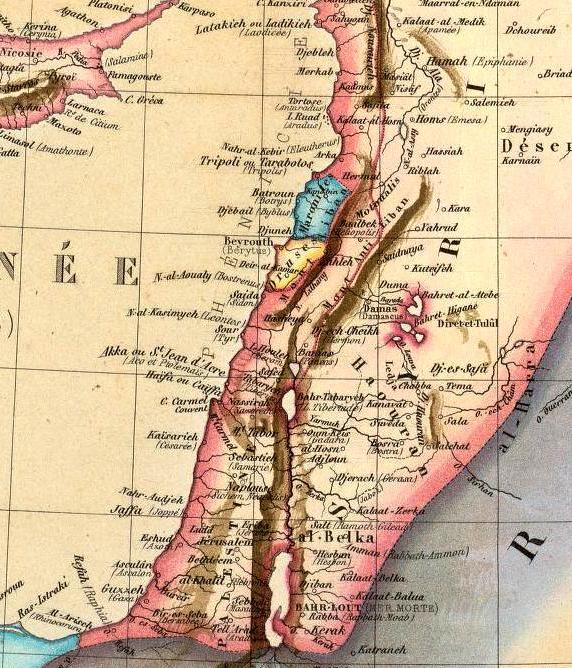
1860 map showing the division between the Maronites and Druze

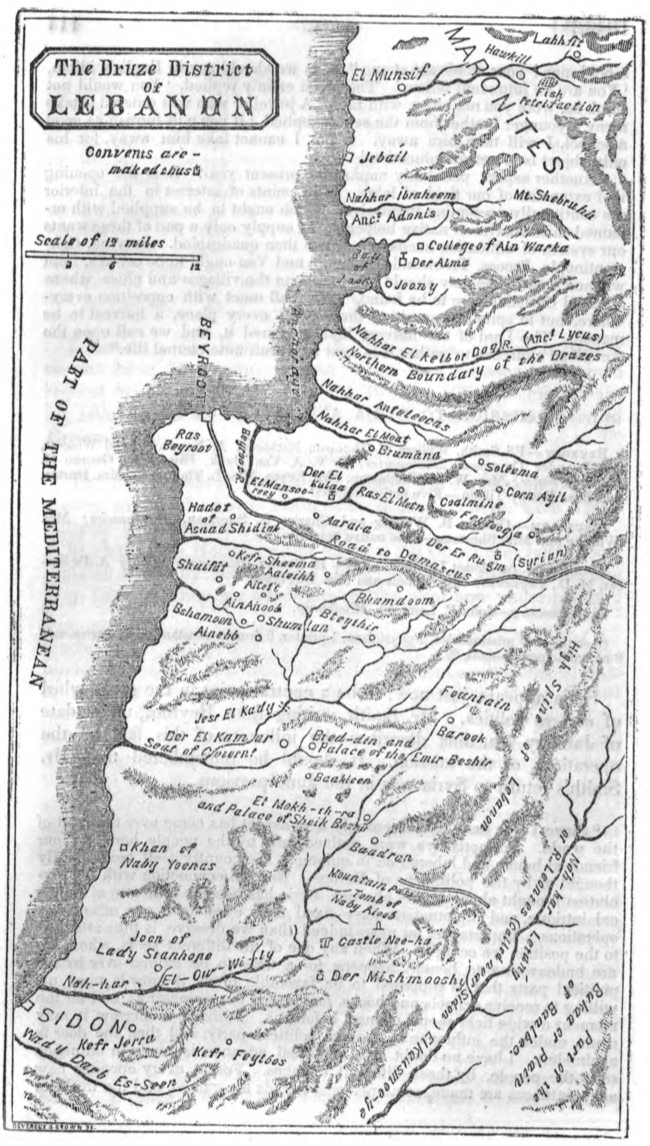
1844 map of the Druze province, showing the Nahr al-Kalb as the northern boundary of the Druze district

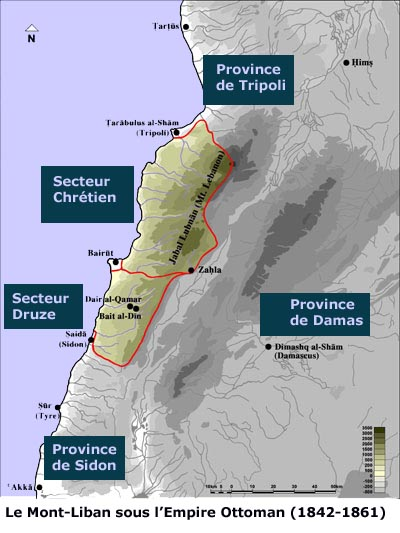
Map of the Double Qaim-Maqamate in French

== See also ==
- Mount Lebanon Mutasarrifate
