= Emirate of Mount Lebanon =

Former country

Emirate of Mount Lebanon إِمَارَة جَبَل لُبْنَان (Arabic)
- 1516–1842
- Flag

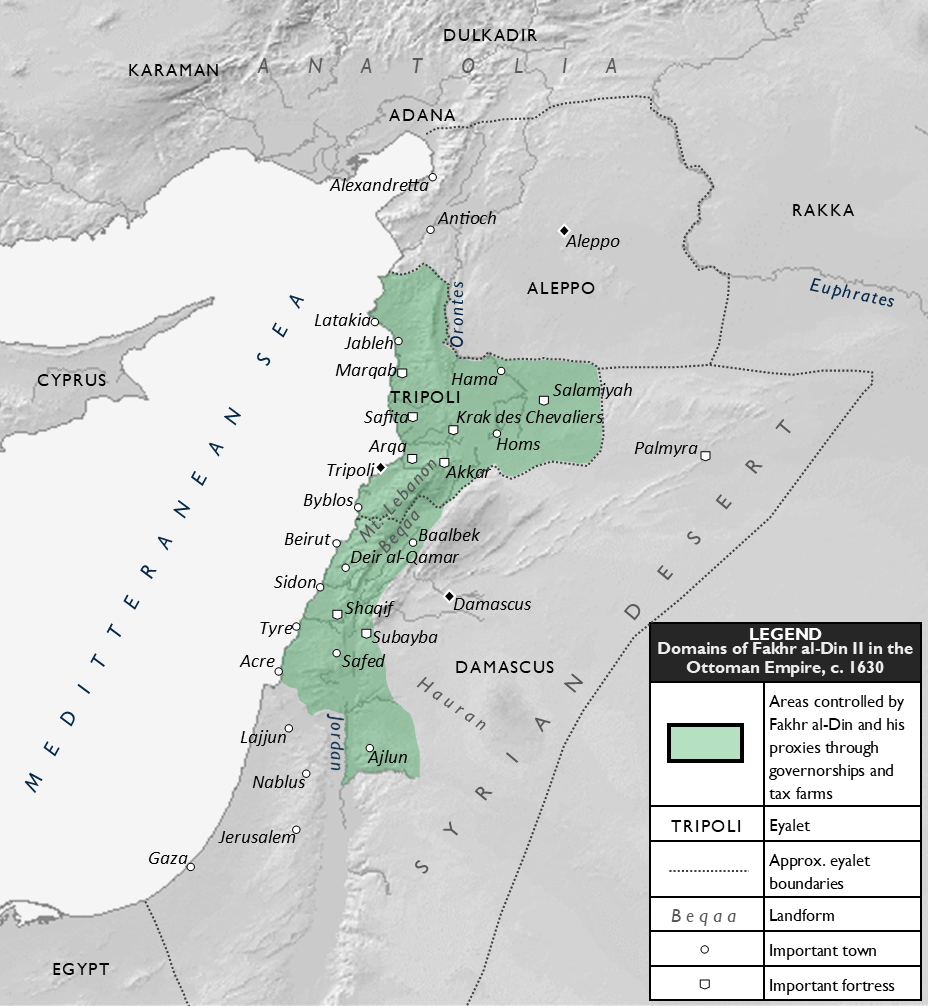
- The Emirate of Mount Lebanon at its greatest extent under Fakhr al-Din II, circa 1630
- Status: Vassal of the Ottoman Empire
- Capital: Baakleen (1516–1600); Deir al-Qamar (1600–1811); Beit ed-Dine (1811–1842)
- Common languages: Arabic
- Religion: Christianity; Druze faith Islam
- Demonym: Lebanese
- Government: Emirate
- History
  - Ottoman–Mamluk War: 1516
  - Convention of London: 1842
- Currency: Ottoman Lira
Preceded by	Succeeded by
Mamluk Sultanate	Double Qaim-Maqamate of Mount Lebanon
- Today part of: Lebanon; Syria; Jordan; Israel; Palestine

The Emirate of Mount Lebanon (Arabic: إِمَارَة جَبَل لُبْنَان) was a part of Mount Lebanon that enjoyed variable degrees of partial autonomy under the stable suzerainty of the Ottoman Empire between the mid-16th and the early-19th century. The town of Baakleen was the seat of local power during the Ma'an period until Fakhr-al-Din II chose to live in Deir el Qamar due to a water shortage in Baakleen. Deir el Qamar remained the seat until Bashir Shihab II ascended to the throne and moved its court to the Beiteddine palace. Beiteddine remains the capital of the Chouf District today. Fakhr-al-Din II, the most prominent Druze tribal leader at the end of the 16th century, was given leeway by the Ottomans to subdue other provincial leaderships in Ottoman Syria on their behalf, and was himself subdued in the end, to make way for a firmer control by the Ottoman central administration over the Syrian eyalets. In Lebanese nationalist narratives, he is celebrated as establishing a sort of Druzes–Maronite condominium that is often portrayed as the embryo of Lebanese statehood and national identity. Historians and intellectuals such as Salibi and Beydoun have questioned many of these assumptions, suggesting a more balanced and less ideological approach to this period.

The Maan and Shihab government of different parts of Mount Lebanon, between 1667 and 1841, was an Ottoman iltizam, or tax farm, rather than a dynastic principality, and the multazims were never reigning princes. The relations between the Porte and the Shihab emirs revolved around the payment of taxes, and the official legitimation of their position as multazims. Such was the precariousness of their position that over the more than three centuries of the two dynasties (1516–1840) only two significantly strong leaders emerged, Fakhr al-Din II (1591–1635) and Bashir Shihab II (1788–1840).Although Lebanese nationalist historiographies tended to portray the Emirate as a sort of historical precursor of the Mount Lebanon Mutasarrifate established in 1861, later historians and intellectuals such as Kamal Salibi and Ahmad Beydoun have contested these narratives, and argued that the devolution of functions to local rulers was nothing exceptional in the framework of indirect administration in Ottoman Syria. Partisan narratives gave different names to this entity (including "Shuf Emirate", "Emirate of Jabal Druze", "Emirate of Mount Lebanon", as well as "Ma'an Emirate"), whose boundaries were not well defined, mostly because of its rather vague juridical and administrative status.

== History ==
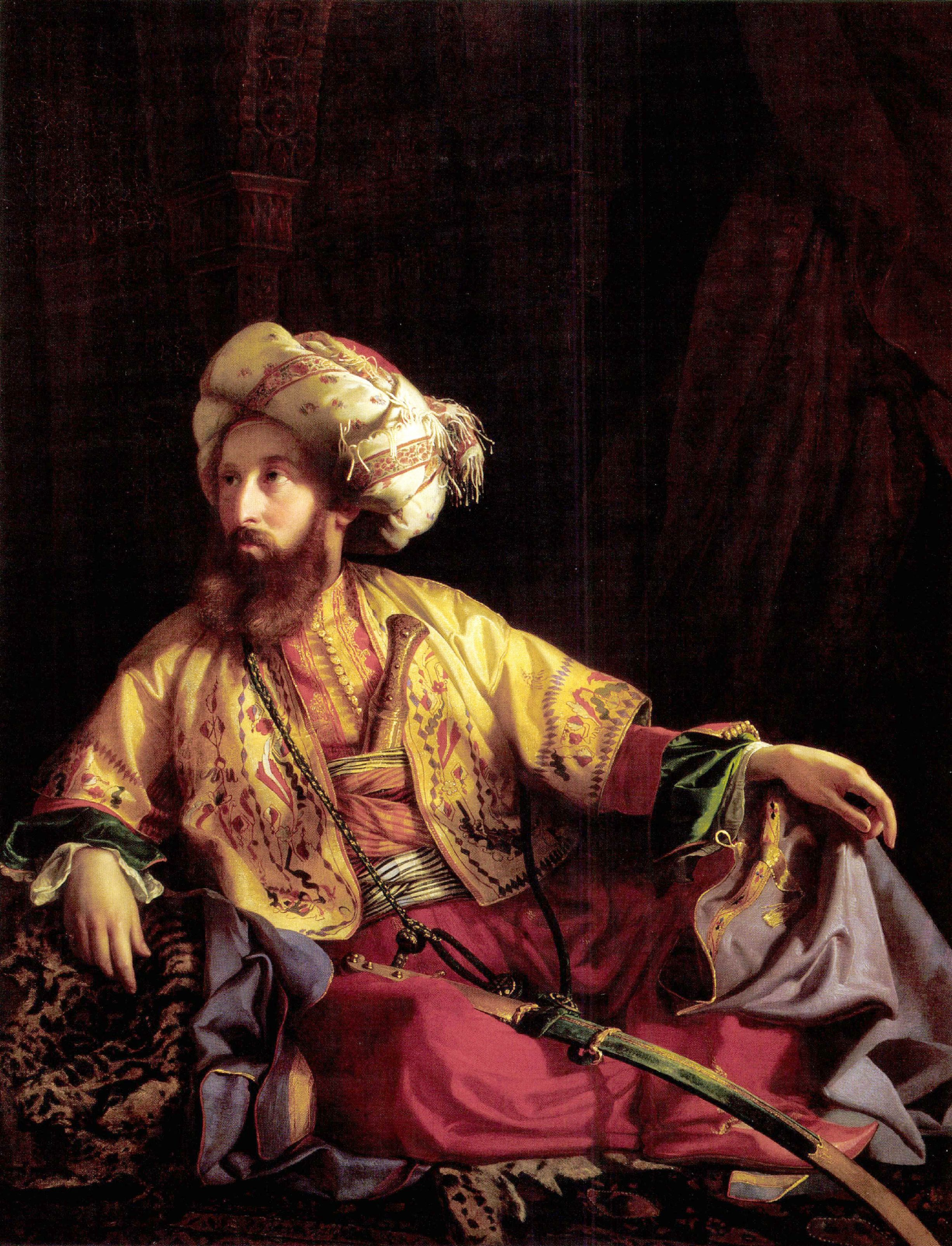
Emir of Lebanon, by József Borsos, 1843.

=== Maanid dynasty ===
The Ma‘ans came to power in the early 16th century, and both Fakhr al-Din I and Fakhr al-Din II greatly expanded the territory while acting as the principal local tax farmer (multazim) for the Ottoman state. In general, the tax-farming system meant that the multazims always served at the sultan's pleasure, and given this degree of insecurity they would try to collect as much tax as they could, within the limits of the taxpayers' physical ability to pay.

==== Fakhr al-Din I (1516–1544) ====
Fakhr al-Din I (1516–1544), was supposedly awarded with the emirate of the Shuf after fighting on the side of Selim I at the Battle of Marj Dabiq. In any case, he emerged soon afterwards as a local force, and was the first member of the Ma'an dynasty to serve the Ottomans. The Ottomans divided the territories they conquered from the Mamluks into wilayas, sanjaks and nahiyas, and assigned qadis and military governors to the larger administrative divisions. However, they farmed out the task of tax collection to powerful local leaders, who maintained their positions by a combination of bribing local Ottoman officials and asserting themselves over less local power-holders. The Ma'an family holdings (muqata'ah) were originally divided among the three wilayas of Damascus, Tripoli, and Sidon. The family had not been prominent under the Mamluks, but was strong enough under the Ottomans to be in charge of dividing the tax-farms assigned to it among a number of lesser local notables. By the end of his reign, Fakhr al-Din I's authority extended from the borders of Jaffa to Tripoli.

==== Qurqumaz (1544–1585) ====
Fakhr al-Din was succeeded by his son Qurqumaz, who was involved in frequent conflicts both with his neighbours and with the Ottomans, as the tax-farming system involved constant power struggles. In 1544 the emir Qurqumaz succeeded his father Fakhr al-Din. In 1585, a caravan transporting the taxes collected in Egypt and Syria was plundered at Djun 'Akkar. The Ottomans, suspecting the Ma‘an of complicity and of having sheltered the criminals, invaded Mount Lebanon. The emir Qurqumaz shut himself up in the inaccessible rock of Shakif Tirun near Jezzine and died there, 'of chagrin or poison', in 1585. Qurqumaz was succeeded by his thirteen-year-old son, who became Fakhr al-Din II in 1591, after a hiatus of six years.

==== Fakhr-al-Din II (1591–1635) ====
Flag of the Ma'n dynasty

Fakhr al-Din II (1591–1635) was the most renowned of the Maanid rulers, although his position was as precarious as that of his predecessors and his successors. In 1587, with the accession of Shah Abbas I, Safavid power began to revive, and the Ottoman–Persian Wars were soon resumed. In Syria, the Safavids could use local Shiite political leverage against the Ottomans. To reduce the Shiite danger, the Ottomans turned to the Maans, who stood chastened and subservient after the successful Ottoman expedition sent against them in 1586. Their choice fell on Fakhr al-Din Maan, the son of Qurqumaz. In about 1590, Fakhr al-Din was appointed governor of the Sanjak of Sidon, to which the Sanjak of Beirut was subsequently attached. In 1598, as the wars between the Safavids and the Ottomans broke out again, he was also appointed governor of the Sanjak of Safad, which gave him direct control over the pro-Safavid Shiites of Jabal Amil.

In the 1610s he defeated his two principal opponents, Yusuf Sayfa and Amir Mansur ibn Furaykh. This, coupled with his attack on Damascus in 1607 (together with other local lords), evidently alarmed the Ottomans. In an attempt to achieve independence for Lebanon, he concluded a secret agreement with Ferdinand I of Tuscany, pledging to support each other against the Ottomans. After discovering the agreement, the Ottomans ordered Ahmad al Hafiz, governor of Damascus, to attack him. Fakhr al-Din temporarily abdicated in favour of his brother Yunus and his son Ali, and spent the next five years in exile in Europe. He only returned when his friend Silihdar Mehmed Pasha became governor of Damascus in 1618. When he returned to Lebanon he ruled more or less unchallenged for the next fifteen years, as the Ottomans were too engrossed in their wars with the Safavids to give any serious attention to the situation. In 1623, Mustafa Pasha, the new governor of Damascus, engaged him in battle, and was decisively defeated at Battle of Anjar near Anjar in the Biqa Valley. Impressed by the victory, the Ottoman Sultan gave him the title of "Sultan al Barr" (Sultan of the Mountain).

Fakhr al-Din, in his later years, came to control the whole territory of modern Lebanon. Even then, the Shuf remained his power base. The control of the Sanjak of Safad, and also of the Sanjak of Ajlun and other parts of Transjordan, were at least as important, politically, as the control of the sanjaks of Beirut and Sidon, or the different mountain nahiyas of the Sanjak of Tripoli, in the Eyalet of Tripoli. Eventually, however, the Wāli of Damascus, Kücük Ahmed Pasha, was despatched at the head of an army against Fakhr al-Din, who was defeated, captured and taken to Istanbul, where he was executed in 1635 along with Yunus and Ali.

==== Later emirs ====
The dynasty continued, greatly weakened, until the death of Ahmad (reigned 1658–1697) when its functions were taken over by the Shihab family.

=== Shihab dynasty ===
The Shihab Emirs:

- Bashir I Shihab (1697–1706)
- Haydar Shihab (1706–1729)
- Milhim Shihab (1729–1754)
- Ahmad and Mansur Shihab (1754–1763)
- Yusuf Shihab (1763–1788)
- Bashir Shihab II (1788–1840)
- Bashir Shihab III (1841)

When the last male descendant in the Maan family line died in 1697, his vassals chose Haydar al-Shihab as emir. The Shihab (or Chehab) family was somewhat unusual in a region politically dominated by Druze dynasties, as they were nominally practitioners of Sunni Islam.

The Shihabs, starting in 1711, introduced a unique system of fiscal cantons in the Shuf mountains and Kisrawan, and later in the northern Lebanon, giving their regime a special character within the Ottoman system. The Shihab emirs were appointed as multazims of their territories on an annual basis, and their position in this respect was always precarious, yet they remained at the top of the feudal hierarchy.

Under their government, the Druze and Maronite sheikhs of the different cantons worked in cooperation. Even the Druze sheikhs who were most vehemently opposed to the Shihab regime could not find a workable alternative to the Shihab system, for as long as this system remained in place.

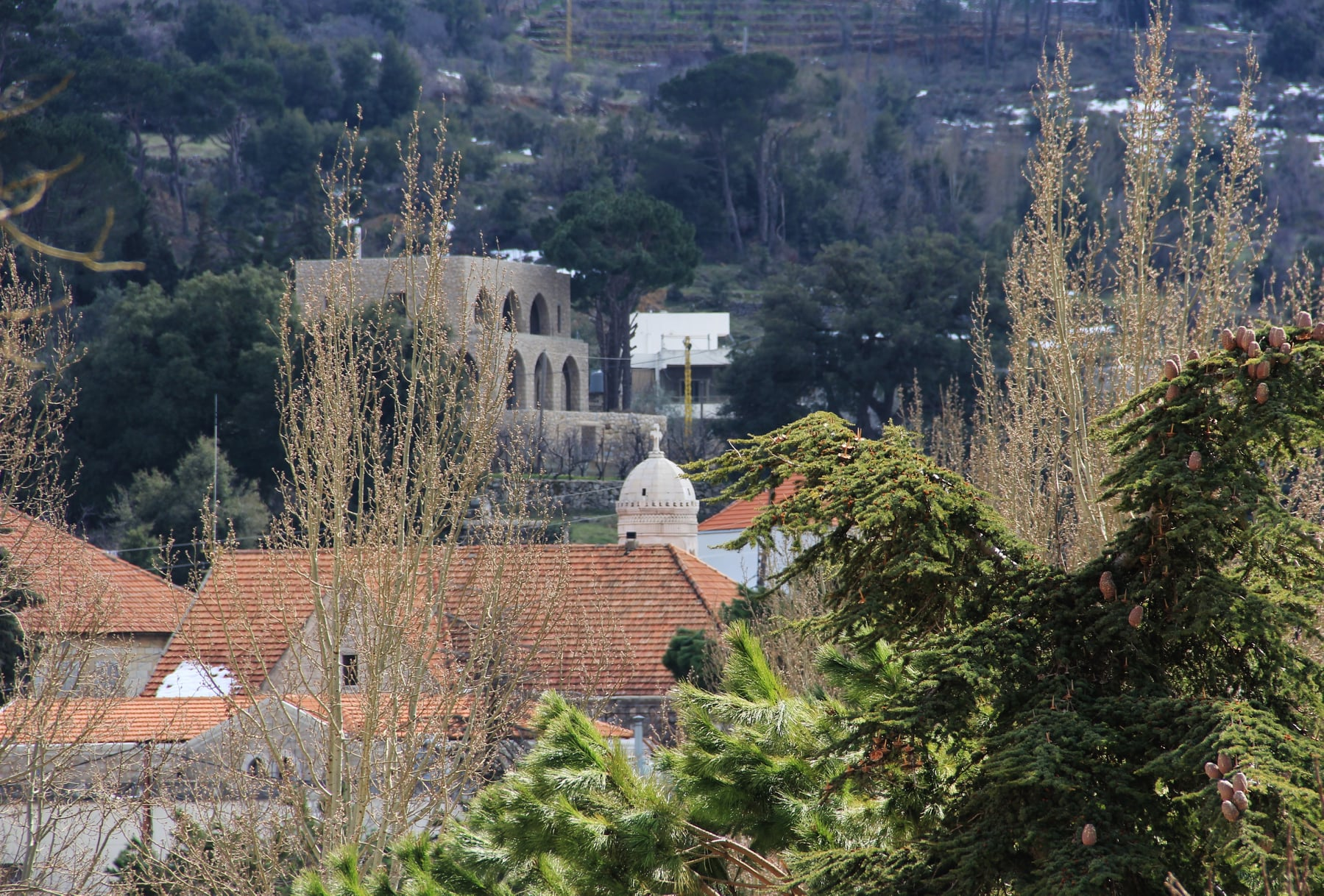
Christian Church and Druze Khalwa in Shuf Mountains: Historically; the Druzes and the Christians in the Shuf Mountains lived in complete harmony.

The "Druze-Christian alliance" during this century was the major factor enabling the Shehab dynasty to maintain power. By the middle years of the eighteenth century, the Shihabi amirs converted to Christianity, so did several Druze amirs and prominent Druze clans, like the originally Druze Abillama clan (a Druze family who was a close ally of the Shihabs) which also converted to Christianity and joined the Maronite Church. After the Shehab dynasty converted to Christianity, the Druze lost most of their political and feudal powers. Also, the Druze formed an alliance with Britain and allowed Protestant Christian missionaries to enter Mount Lebanon, creating tension between them and the native Maronite Church.

==== Haydar al-Shihab (1697–1732) ====
Haydar was a Sunni, though his mother was a Druze from the Maan clan. He spent the next decade trying to win the support of various Druze and Shia clans in southern and central Lebanon. His rivals called in help from the Ottomans in 1711, but before the Ottoman expeditionary force could arrive, Haydar defeated his local rivals at the Battle of Ain Dara and seized the former Mann capital of Deir el Qamar.

Through intermarriage, Haydar effected an alliance with two powerful Druze groups, the Abu-Lamma family and the Janbulad Family. That alliance lasted for most of the 18th century.

==== Milhim al-Shihab (1732–1753) ====
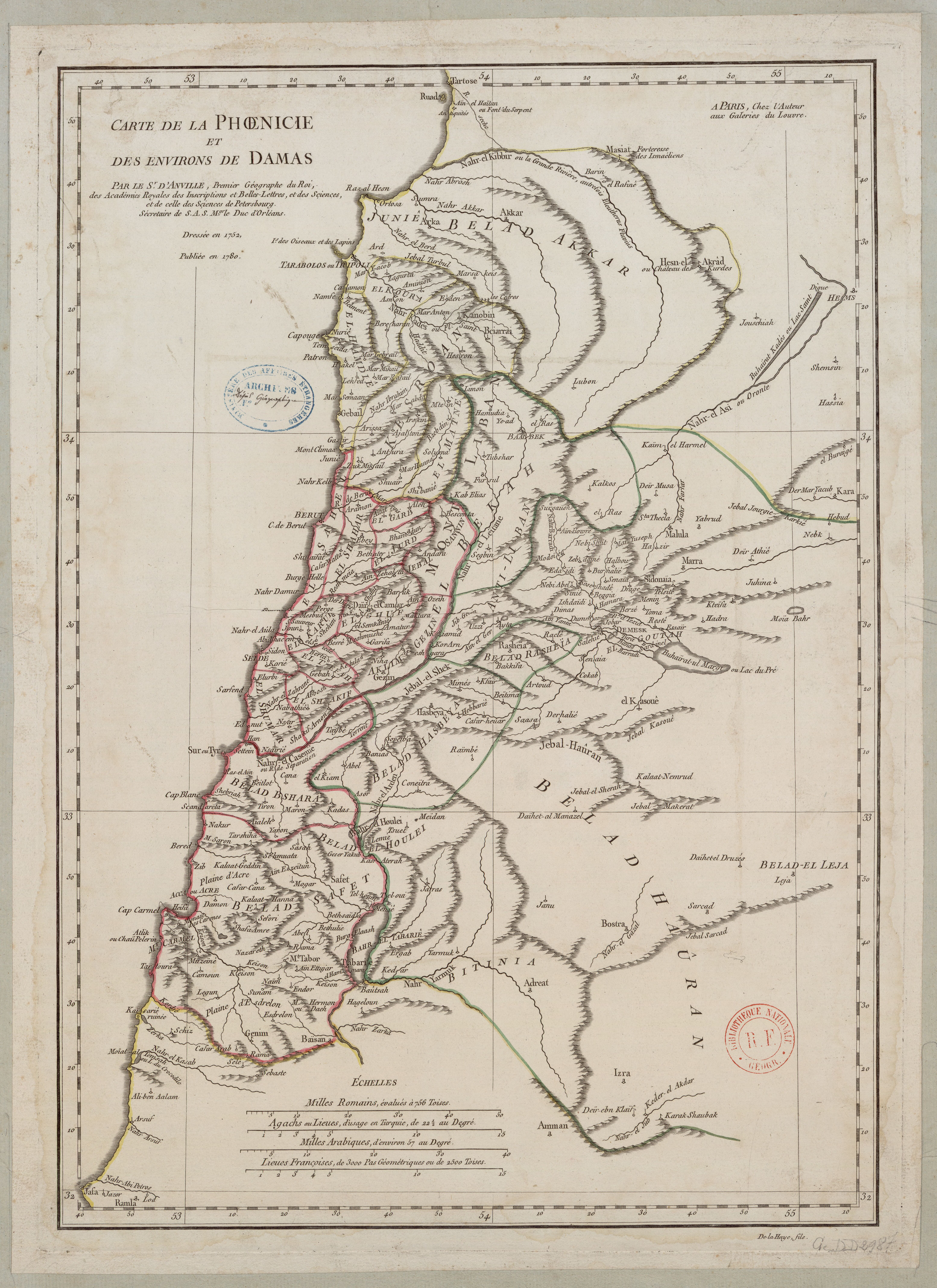
1752 map of the region

Milhim al-Shihab succeeded Haydar in 1732. Milhim repeatedly succeeded in avoiding the payment of the regular amount of taxes to the Ottoman authorities, and in 1748 the governor of Damascus launched a punitive expedition against him. In the 1750s, Milhim attempted to acquire a firman confirming his authority over the Shuf and that of his nephew Quasim over Byblios, but the attempt failed, as the political climate in Istanbul changed after the death of Sultan Osman III in 1757. After his abdication in 1753, the administration was run by Mansur and Ahmad al-Shihab for several years (1753–1763), and then by Qasim al-Shihab. A power struggle ensued, and in the 1760s Yusuf al-Shihab emerged as administrator of the Shuf.

==== Yusuf al-Shihab (1770–1788) ====
Yusuf, son of Mulhim, gained the title of emir in 1770. It is not clear whether or not Yusuf converted to Christianity, as he participated in both Muslim and Christian religious services and visited Druze and Christian shrines. During this period, the Lebanese mountains were relatively quiet, although feuds between individual families still frequently flared into violence. The status quo was shattered with the Mamluk invasion of Syria in 1770. Yusuf al-Shihab aided the Mamluks and his troops even briefly occupied Damascus. But in the aftermath of the Mamluk withdrawal, Sultan Mustafa III appointed Cezzar Ahmed Pasha to the governorship of Sidon. From his stronghold in Acre, Cezzar Ahmed steadily acquired territories that had been held by vassals of the Shihab clan.

In 1789, when there was an attempted coup against Cezzar Ahmed, he became convinced that Yusuf al-Shihab was behind it. In reprisal, he moved his army into Lebanon where he defeated the Shihabs in a battle in the Bekaa Valley. In defeat, Yusuf abdicated, and his vassals then chose his cousin Bashir.

==== Bashir Shihab II (1788–1841) ====
Flag of the Shihab dynasty

Bashir (usually referred to as Bashir II to distinguish him from Haydar's father) was emir until 1841, making him the longest-reigning emir of the Lebanese mountains. He was viewed as a just but tough prince at the time. In this period, Lebanon began to modernize its administrative institutions. He made the Emirate stronger because he eliminated bickering petty feudal leaders and united the country with a tight grip. Bashir openly acknowledged that he was a Christian but at the same time he respected his Muslim subjects reminding them of Qureishi roots of Shihab princes. The Abi-Lamma clan, a Druze family who was a close ally of the Shihabs, also became Christians around the same time. After the death of Cezzar Ahmed in 1804, Bashir II moved to destroy the feudal families his predecessors had relied upon as allies.

When Ibrahim Pasha moved his army into Syria in 1831, Bashir II offered his allegiance to the Egyptian forces and was granted extensive authority over much of Lebanon. He used his power to channelize taxes to create an effective military and administrative structure, which were extremely unpopular measures for a portion of the Lebanese feudal chiefs that led to wide-scale revolts by Druze and Christian tribal groups which he successfully suppressed. However, Bashir II was deposed by the British fleet anchored off Beirut and went into exile to Turkey.

==== Bashir Shihab III (1841–1842) ====
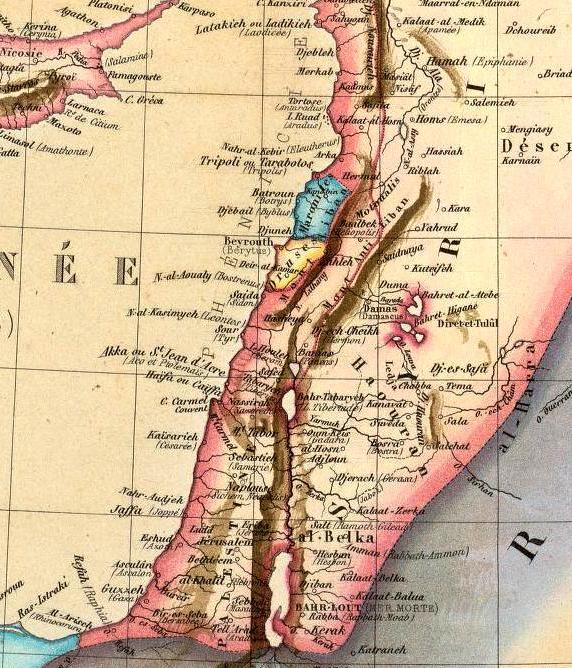
Contemporary map showing the division between Maronites and Druze between 1840 and 1860

After Bashir II went into exile, the Ottoman sultan appointed Bashir III, Bashir II's distant cousin, as emir in 1841, but it was not a popular choice. Not long after his appointment the new emir called the principal Druze families to Deir el Qamar to discuss his tax policies. The families showed up armed and besieged him in his palace in October 1841. The stalemate ended in January 1842 when the sultan withdrew his appointment and Bashir III went into exile in Constantinople.

With that, the Shihab dynasty collapsed. There were attempts to restore Bashir III as Emir after the civil unrest in Lebanon in 1861, but they were unsuccessful.

=== 1840–1860 Partition ===
In the mid-1840s, the population of the Emirate was estimated at 300,000, of which less than 100,000 lived in "mixed districts".

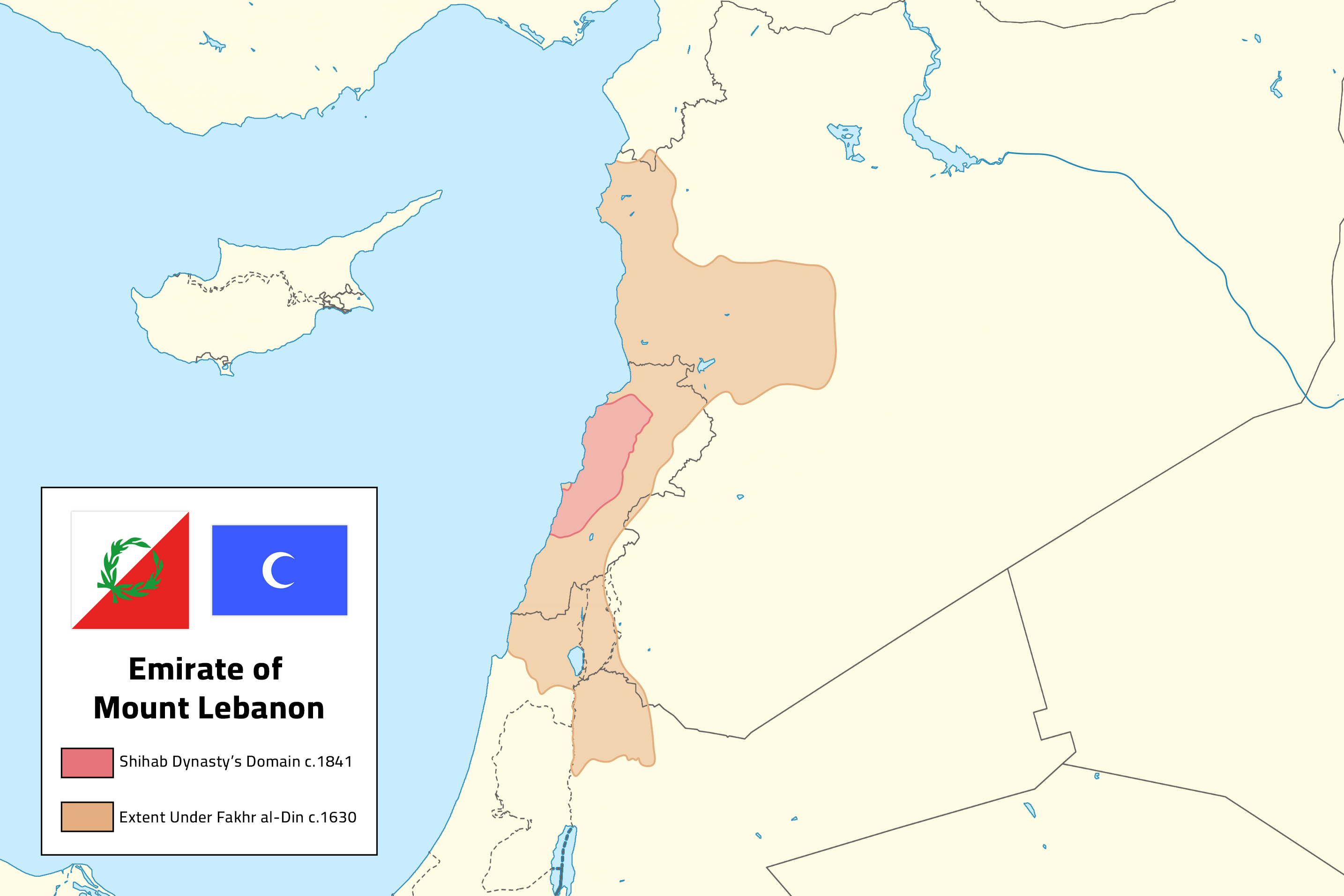
Emirate of Mount Lebanon at its greatest extent (1630) and just before partition (1841).

Following continued animosity and fighting between the Maronites and the Druze, representatives of the European powers proposed to Sultan Abdülmecid I that the Lebanon be partitioned into Christian and Druze sections. The Sublime Porte was finally compelled to relinquish its plans for the direct rule of the Lebanon, and on December 7, 1842, the sultan adopted prince Metternich's proposal and asked Assad Pasha, the governor (wali) of Beirut, to divide the Mount Lebanon, into two districts: a northern district under a Christian Kaymakam and a southern district under a Druze Kaymakam, both chosen among tribal leaders. Both officials were to report to the governor of Sidon, who resided in Beirut.

== Social order and hierarchy ==
=== Social hierarchy ===
Districts	Christians	Druze	Muslims
Matn	10,990	2,105	100
Arqoub	2,760	2,790	-
Two Choufs	4,290	8,695	-
Two Gharbs	3,675	3,940	40
Jezzin	5,330	65	560
Jurd	2,410	1,820	3,190
Kharroub	3,390	45	-
Manassif	1,195	1,695	-
Shahhar	3,970	1,050	-
Sahil	7,395	75	899
Tuffah	4,815	5	105
Deir el-Qamar	4,385	1,979	
Total	54,606	24,264	4,894
1844 estimates from M. Bouree to François Guizot, Paris, 30 July 1844.

Pre-1860 Mount Lebanon was structured around a status-based hierarchy dividing elite notables and clergy from the rural population (ahali). Authority rested not primarily on religious identity but on lineage, rank, and control over religious and political knowledge. Elite families (Druze and Maronite alike) formed cross-confessional alliances, while commoners were largely excluded from political participation. Consequently, political violence was hierarchical, rather than sectarian.

=== Political volence as hierarchical ===
Political violence in the emirate functioned to preserve social hierarchy. Elites were punished differently from the general public, and popular revolts were framed as disorder arising from ignorance rather than legitimate political dissent. Religious language was sometimes used tactically to denounce rebels, but such accusations were strategic rather than permanent and not intended to discriminate against certain religious groups.

=== Subordination of confessional identities ===
While tensions between elite factions existed, the political order before the mid-19th century was structured primarily by hierarchy and patronage rather than sectarian ideology. Religious identities were politically subordinated until 1839–40. Sectarianism, which marked a break from the earlier system, emerged from a combination of new developments such as the Egyptian occupation (1831–1840), the fall of the Shihab dynasty, the Tanzimat reforms and their competing interpretations, and European intervention.

== See also ==
- Vassal and tributary states of the Ottoman Empire
- George Lutfallah, self-styled Emir of Lebanon, Lebanese socialite and political aspirant
