= Mansur Shihab =

Emir of Mount Lebanon
- Reign: 1754–1770
- Predecessor: Mulhim Shihab
- Successor: Yusuf Shihab
- Born: 1714
- Died: 1774 (aged 59–60)
- Issue: Hammud; Haydar II
- Dynasty: Shihab dynasty
- Father: Mulhim Shihab
- Religion: Sunni Islam

Mansur Shihab (Arabic: منصور الشهابي) was the Emir of Mount Lebanon between 1754 and 1770. He and his brother Ahmad took the reins of power from their ailing brother Mulhim Shihab and ruled jointly until Mansur became the sole emir after winning a power struggle with Ahmad in 1763. Mansur aligned himself with Daher al-Umar and Ali Bey, the autonomous rulers of Galilee and Egypt, respectively, in their rebellion against the Ottomans. Mansur was subsequently forced by the Druze sheikhs of Mount Lebanon to step down in favor his nephew Yusuf Shihab after Daher and Ali Bey were defeated in 1770.

== Family ==
Mansur was born in 1714. His father was Haydar Shihab, the Emir of Mount Lebanon, a semi-autonomous region in the Ottoman province of Sidon. They belonged to the Shihab dynasty which succeeded the Ma'an dynasty as the rulers of Mount Lebanon.

== Emir of Mount Lebanon ==
After Haydar died in 1732, his son and Mansur's brother, Mulhim, succeeded him. A power struggle later ensued between Mulhim and Mansur in 1753 and when the former became sick, Mansur and his other brother Ahmad and the powerful Druze clans successfully pressured him to relinquish his authority to Mansur and Ahmad, who were to rule jointly, in 1754. Afterward, Mulhim and his nephew Qasim Shihab tried to oust Mansur and Ahmad, but were unsuccessful. In 1760, a year after Mulhim died, the governor of Sidon, an ally of Qasim, forced Mansur to hand over control of the Shuf region, but Mansur and Ahmad raised 50,000 qirsh (modern equivalent of $600,000) to restore their control.

Mansur and Ahmad turned against each other in a power struggle in 1763, with the latter mobilizing the Yazbaki faction—an alliance of the Druze clans of Imad, Talhuq and Abd al-Malik—against Mansur, who was backed by the Druze Jumblatt clan and the governor of Sidon. Ahmad acquiesced to Mansur's authority after realizing his brother had the stronger position. Abd al-Salam Imad of the Yazbaki faction and Ali Jumblatt mediated between Mansur and Ahmad and came to an agreement where Mansur would rule alone, while Ahmad could live in peace at Deir al-Qamar.

Although Mansur and Ahmad had ended their dispute, Mulhim's son Yusuf Shihab, had declared his support for Ahmad and sought shelter with Mansur's ally, Sheikh Ali Jumblatt. Jumblatt attempted to mediate the dispute between the uncle and nephew, but Mansur dismissed the gesture and seized Yusuf's properties. Jumblatt subsequently defected from Mansur's camp and gave his backing to Yusuf, who also approached Uthman Pasha al-Kurji, the governor of Damascus for support. Uthman Pasha instructed his son, the governor of Tripoli to assign Yusuf authority over the fiefs of Byblos and Batroun, which became Yusuf's base of operations against Mansur, who was based further south in the Shuf.

In 1768, an alliance was formed between Daher al-Umar, the semi-autonomous Arab sheikh of northern Palestine and Nasif al-Nassar, the preeminent Shia Muslim sheikh of Jabal Amil, the mountainous region between Mount Lebanon and Palestine. Mansur was a close ally of Daher and supported him and Ali Bey of Egypt in their rebellion against the Ottomans and occupation of Damascus. According to a later Lebanese chronicler, Mansur "much loved Daher al-Umar and rejoiced" at his joint invasion of Syria and Palestine with Ali Bey. The defeat of Ali Bey and Daher prompted the Ottoman authorities to punish Mansur for siding with them. This consequently brought a withdrawal of confidence for Mansur from the Druze clans. He was dismissed and succeeded by Yusuf in 1770.

== Later life and death ==
Mansur later acted as a mediator between Yusuf and Daher, who were ostensible enemies, when Yusuf needed Daher's ally, the Russian Navy, to back him against Jezzar Pasha, the Ottoman general who ousted Yusuf from Beirut. Mansur died in 1774.

== Bibliography ==
- Abu Izzeddin, Nejla M. (1993). The Druzes: A New Study of Their History, Faith, and Society. Brill. ISBN 9789004097056.
- Farah, Caesar E. (2000). Politics of Interventionism in Ottoman Lebanon, 1830-1861. I.B. Tauris. ISBN 9781860640568.
- Harris, William (2012). Lebanon: A History, 600–2011. OUP USA. ISBN 978-0-19-518111-1.

Preceded by Mulhim Shihab	Emir of Mount Lebanon; 1754–1774	Succeeded by Yusuf Shihab
