= Bashir III =

Emir of Lebanon from 1840 to 1842

Prince Bashir Chehab III (Arabic: بشير الثالث الشهابي) was a ruler of the Mount Lebanon Emirate (7th Emir, reigned 1840–1842). The family name is often rendered as Shihab. After Prince Bashir II was banished from Lebanon, the Ottoman authorities in Asitana (Istanbul) appointed Prince Bashir III from the Chehab family to replace him.

== Early life ==
Also known as Bashir Qasim al-Chehab, he was born in 1775, the son of Prince Qasim, and nephew of Emir Yusuf Chehab, (5th Emir of Lebanon, reigned 1770–1790). He died in 1860.

== Legacy ==
The historians of the time commemorated him with the most cynical tales ever told about a Lebanese ruler, no one knows of any significant, rewarding things he did during his rule, and his followers gave him the humiliating nickname "Abou Taheen - أبو طحين" (father of flour), which by Greater Lebanese standards was a derogatory adjective.

Other anecdotes about Bashir III had been recorded by the contemporary author Salam Al Rassi, as well as by the historian Fouad Aphram Al Boustany. They both told that Prince Bashir III enjoyed breeding pigeons, but since he had a kind of urological disease forcing him to urinate frequently, he had a toilet built for himself over the roof, so that he could enjoy his pigeon breeding hobby without having to worry about his condition. A saying is still remembered by the elders in Lebanon - a poetry verse in Lebanese dialect: "و الامير بشير التالت بشو قام؟ عمّر ششما و برج للحمام", which, when translated, reads as "As for Prince Bashir the Third, what was his accomplishment? He built a pigeon tower with a toilet".
