= Bashir Shihab II =

Emir of Lebanon from 1789 to 1840

Bashir Shihab
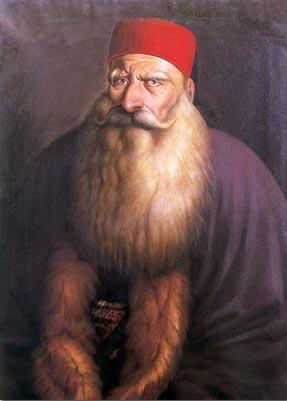
- Portrait of Bashir Shihab II

Emir of Mount Lebanon
- Reign: September 1789 – October 1840
- Predecessor: Yusuf Shihab
- Successor: Bashir Shihab III
- Born: 2 January 1767; Ghazir, Sidon Eyalet, Ottoman Empire
- Died: 1850 (aged 82–83); Istanbul, Ottoman Empire
- Spouse: Shams Shihab (m. 1787; died 1829) Hisn Jihan (m. 1833)
- Issue: Qasim (son); Khalil (son); Amin (son); Sa'da (daughter); Sa'ud (daughter)
- Dynasty: Shihab dynasty
- Father: Qasim Shihab
- Religion: Maronite Catholic

Bashir Shihab II (Arabic: بشير الثاني الشهابي, romanized: Bashīr al-Thānī al-Shihābī, also spelled Bachir Chehab II; 2 January 1767 – 1850) was a Lebanese emir who ruled the Emirate of Mount Lebanon between 1788 –1840. Born to a branch of the Shihab family which had converted from Sunni Islam, the religion of previous Shihabi emirs, he was the only Maronite ruler of the Mount Lebanon Emirate.

== Early life and family ==
Bashir was born in 1767 in Ghazir, a village in the Keserwan region of Mount Lebanon. He was the son of Qasim ibn Umar ibn Haydar ibn Husayn Shihab of the Shihab dynasty, which had been elected to the super tax farm of Mount Lebanon by Druze nobility, also known as the Mount Lebanon Emirate, when their Druze kinsmen, the Ma'an dynasty died heirless in 1697. Although the Shihab family was ostensibly Sunni Muslim, some members of the family had converted to the Maronite Catholic Church. Bashir was among the first members of his extended family to be born a Christian.

In 1768, when Bashir was still an infant, his father Qasim died. Bashir's mother remarried, and he and his elder brother Hasan were entrusted to the care of tutors and nannies. The children were raised in poverty and did not benefit from the privileges of a princely birth; their branch of the family was relatively poor. Bashir and Hasan developed feelings of mistrust from their childhoods that made them wary of their companions and of members of their own family. Leadership of Qasim's branch of the family was taken up by Hasan. The latter had a reputation for being cruel and aloof. Bashir, meanwhile, grew to become a cunning, stubborn and clever opportunist who was more able to control his temper and conceal his callousness. He sought out wealth working with his cousin Emir Yusuf in Deir al-Qamar, the virtual capital of Mount Lebanon, where he also gained an education. Bashir's personal qualities established him as a leading figure in the Shihabi court where he engaged in political intrigues. His activity in Deir al-Qamar attracted the attention of Qasim Jumblatt, Yusuf's main adversary, who sought to install Bashir at the head of the emirate. When probed on the subject by the Jumblatt sheikhs, Bashir was noncommittal but left room for negotiations; his hesitance was a result of his financial destitution.

=== Marriages and children ===
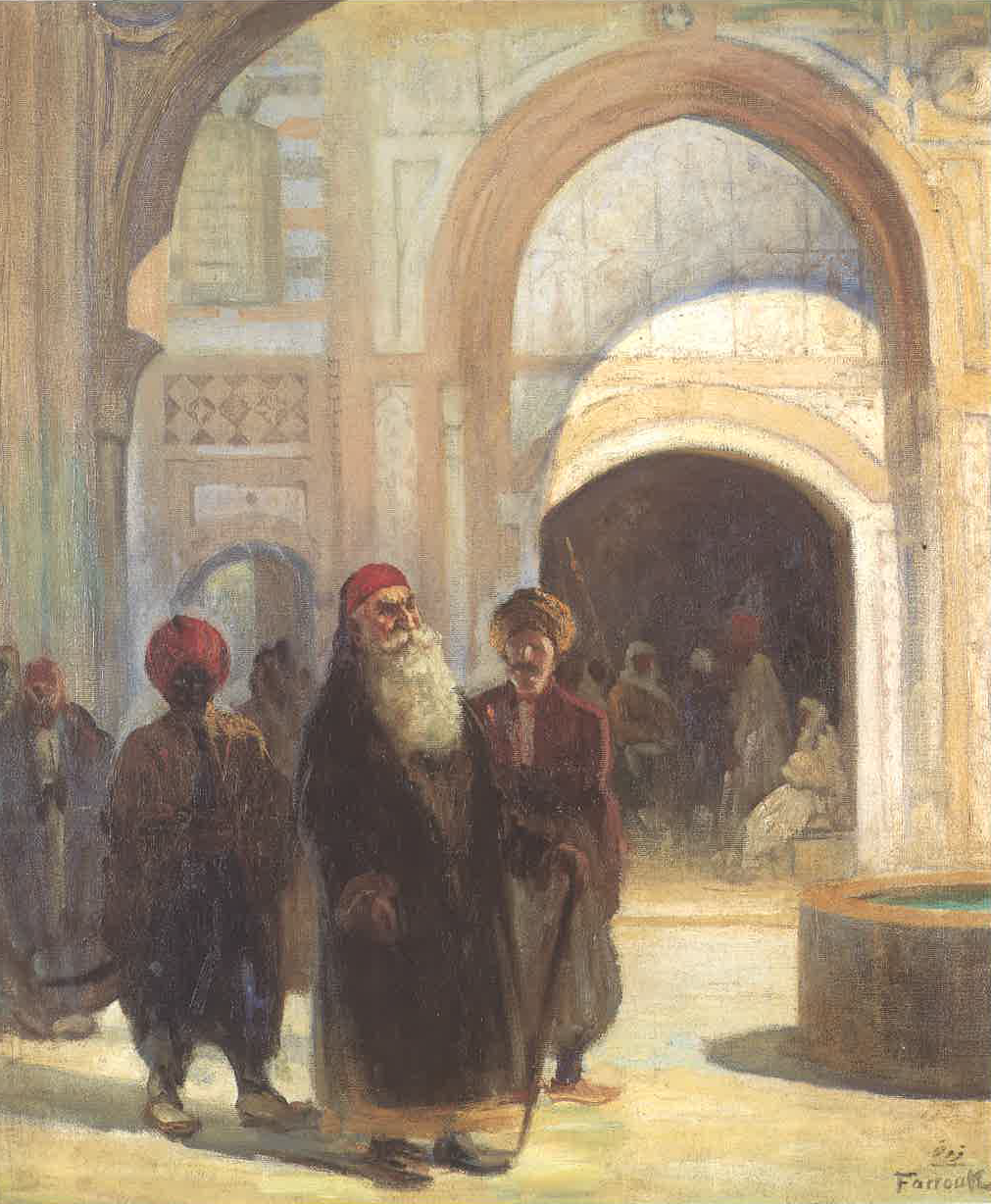
Emir Bashir and Sheikh Nasif al-Yaziji at Beiteddine Palace, by Moustafa Farroukh, 1937

Bashir II's financial fortunes changed in 1787 when he was dispatched to Hasbaya to inventory the assets of Yusuf's maternal uncle, Bashir ibn Najm, the son of Najm Shihab, leader of the Sunni Muslim, Hasbaya-based branch of the clan. Yusuf killed Bashir ibn Najm for backing the revolt against him led by Yusuf's brother Ahmad. During Bashir II assignment in Hasbaya, he married Bashir ibn Najm's wealthy widow, Shams. She was also known as "Hubus" and "Shams al-Madid", the latter of which translates in Arabic as "sun of the long day". Bashir II had previously encountered Shams on a hunting trip to Kfar Nabrakh, but at the time she was arranged by her father, Muhammad Shihab, to be married to Bashir ibn Najm, his nephew. With the latter, Shams had a son named Nasim and a daughter named Khadduj. Although Bashir II was a Christian and Shams was a Muslim, members of the Shihab family typically married within the family and with the Druze Abu'l Lama clan, regardless of religion. As a result of his marriage to Shams, Bashir II gained considerable wealth. Shams later had three sons with him: Qasim, Khalil and Amin (listed in order of birth).

In 1829, Shams died, and Bashir had a mausoleum built for her nestled in the orchards of Beit el-Din. Afterward, a friend of Bashir from Sidon named Ibrahim al-Jawhari set out to find a new wife for Bashir. Al-Jawhari already knew a Circassian slave girl named Hisn Jihan in Istanbul. She was the daughter of a certain Abdullah Afruz al-Sharkasi, but had been kidnapped by Turkish slave dealers and sold to a certain Luman Bey, who was known to have treated her like a daughter. Al-Jawhari suggested that Bashir marry Jihan. Bashir agreed, but also instructed al-Jawhari to buy her and three other slave girls in case Jihan was not to his satisfaction. In 1833, al-Jawhari brought Jihan (then aged 15) and three other slave girls, Kulhinar, Shafkizar and Maryam, to Bashir. The latter was enthralled by Jihan, married her and built a palace for her in Beit el-Din. Jihan was a Muslim and Bashir had her convert to the Maronite Church before the marriage.

According to contemporary chroniclers of the time, Jihan was seclusive and only left her residence fully veiled, was a loving wife to Bashir, wielded significant influence over him and was reputed for her enchantment and charitable efforts with Mount Lebanon's inhabitants. She became known as sa'adat al-sitt, which translates as "her excellency, the lady". Jihan had two daughters with Bashir, Sa'da and Sa'ud. The other slave girls from Istanbul were married off to Bashir's relatives or associates; Kulhinar was married to Bashir's son Qasim, Shafkizar was married to Bashir's kinsmen Mansur Shihab of Wadi Shahrour and Maryam was married to a certain Agha Nahra al-Bishi'lani of Salima.

== Rule ==
=== Accession ===
Bashir emerged on Mount Lebanon's political scene in the mid-1780s when he became involved in an intra-family dispute over leadership of the Shihabi emirate in 1783. In that dispute, Bashir backed emirs Isma'il and Sayyid-Ahmad Shihab against Emir Yusuf, who ultimately prevailed when the powerful Ottoman governor of Sidon, Ahmad Pasha al-Jazzar, confirmed his control of the Mount Lebanon tax farms after Yusuf promised him a bribe of 1 million qirsh. Bashir subsequently reconciled with Yusuf. Five years later, however, al-Jazzar attempted to collect Yusuf's promissory bribe, but payment of the large sum did not materialize, and al-Jazzar shifted his support to Yusuf's rival, Ali Shihab, Isma'il's son. Ali, who sought to avenge Isma'il's death in Yusuf's custody, and Yusuf mobilized their allies and confronted each other at Jubb Jannin, where Yusuf's forces were routed by Ali and al-Jazzar. Yusuf fled to the Tripoli hinterland and was compelled to request the Druze landowning sheikhs to appoint his replacement. With the key backing of the Jumblatt clan, Bashir was selected by the Druze sheikhs to be their hakim. For the Druze sheikhs of Mount Lebanon, the hakim denoted the leader prince who served as their intermediary with the Ottoman authorities, and who nominally had political, military, social and judicial authority over their affairs. Bashir traveled to al-Jazzar's headquarters in Acre, where he was officially transferred the Mount Lebanon tax farms in September 1789.

Meanwhile, Yusuf attempted to restore himself to the Shihabi emirate, mobilizing his partisans in Byblos and Bsharri, while Bashir had the support of the Jumblatt clan (his main backer among the Druze) and al-Jazzar, who loaned him 1,000 of his Albanian and Maghrebi soldiers. Bashir's forces decisively defeated Yusuf's partisans in the Munaytara hills, but Yusuf escaped after receiving cover from the Ottoman governors of Tripoli and Damascus. However, Yusuf was later invited to Acre by al-Jazzar in a ruse by the latter and was virtually under arrest upon his arrival to the city. While al-Jazzar considered playing Yusuf and Bashir off of each other by soliciting bribes for the Mount Lebanon tax farm, Bashir managed to convince al-Jazzar that Yusuf was causing strife among the Druze clans, and al-Jazzar subsequently decided to execute Yusuf in 1790.

Despite prevailing over Yusuf, the Druze sheikhs of the Yazbaki faction (rivals of the Jumblatti faction) managed to lobby al-Jazzar to transfer the Mount Lebanon tax farms from Bashir to Yusuf's nephews, Qa'dan and Haydar. Not long after, Jirji Baz, the mudabbir (manager) of Yusuf's sons Husayn and Sa'ad ad-Din, persuaded Qa'dan and Haydar to grant Yusuf's sons the tax farm of Jubail. Bashir and his ally Sheikh Bashir Jumblatt resisted this situation by successfully preventing Qa'dan and Haydar from collecting the taxes that they were mandated to deliver to al-Jazzar. The latter lent Emir Bashir and Sheikh Bashir his support against Baz, Yusuf's sons and their Imad (leading clan of the Yazbaki faction) and Abi Nakad backers. Bashir succeeded in forcibly restoring himself as hakim, but by 1794, al-Jazzar again shifted his support to Baz and Yusuf's sons after Bashir apparently fleeced al-Jazzar in his tax payments that year. This was short-lived as al-Jazzar reverted to Bashir in 1795 after abundant complaints were raised against Baz.

=== Conflict with al-Jazzar ===
In 1797, Baz reestablished good offices with al-Jazzar, bringing him Yusuf's sons to pay their respects. Al-Jazzar wielded his potential support for Yusuf's sons as a way to leverage Bashir into paying more taxes or risk losing his Mount Lebanon tax farms. At the same time, Emir Bashir decided to eliminate his Abi Nakad opponents and to that end, he conspired with the Jumblatts and Imads. Emir Bashir invited the Abi Nakad sheikhs to the counselor's quarters of his palace in Deir al-Qamar, where Bashir Jumblatt and the Imad sheikhs ambushed and killed all five of them. According to a contemporary source, the killings effectively meant that the "Nakad name was obliterated".

Relations soured between al-Jazzar and Bashir in 1799, during Napoleon's two-month siege of Acre. Al-Jazzar had called on Bashir to contribute forces to aid Acre's defense, but Bashir disregarded the troop levy. Al-Jazzar was infuriated, and although Bashir took a strictly neutral position in the conflict, al-Jazzar accused him of sending the French troops provisions. He subsequently forced Bashir to depart Mount Lebanon by sending an expeditionary force to help Baz oust Bashir from Deir al-Qamar. Bashir, along with Sheikh Bashir and many of his fellow Jumblatti sheikhs, left Deir al-Qamar and headed north for Akkar and the area of the Krak des Chevaliers (al-Husn). Emir Bashir thereafter penned a letter appealing to the Royal Navy officer, Sir Sidney Smith, whose forces' bombardment of French troops was key in forcing the French withdrawal from Palestine, to use his offices with the imperial Ottoman authorities to restore him to Mount Lebanon. Smith responded positively to his plea, docked his ship in Tripoli's port and met with Bashir, who then accompanied Smith to meet the Ottoman Grand Vizier, Kör Yusuf Ziyaüddin Pasha in al-Arish. Kör Yusuf was in al-Arish commanding the Ottoman ground army to retake Egypt from the French. Bashir informed Kör Yusuf of his situation with al-Jazzar and was treated well by the grand vizier, who thereafter issued a decree granting Bashir fiscal authority over Mount Lebanon, Wadi al-Taym, the Beqaa Valley and the Shia Muslim-dominated Jabal Amil. As part of this arrangement, Bashir would be independent from the governors of Sidon, Tripoli and Damascus and would submit tax revenues directly to the imperial government. However, this major appointment was tempered by Bashir's lack of actual control over his assigned lands, which al-Jazzar had largely transferred to Yusuf's sons and Baz.

In 1800, Emir Bashir appealed for unity with Baz, writing to him, "How long will this fighting continue in which we lose men and our land is devastated?" Baz agreed to meet Bashir in secret and the two reached a deal without al-Jazzar's knowledge, whereby Bashir would control the Druze areas of Mount Lebanon and Maronite-dominated Keserwan, while Yusuf's sons would control the northern areas, such as Jubail and Batroun. Bashir promised to uphold the agreement, swearing an oath on both the Quran and the Gospel. Bashir also hired Baz to be his mudabbir, replacing the Maronite Dahdah clan as his traditional provider of mudabbirs. Al-Jazzar was outraged when the agreement became apparent, and lent his support to the Yazbaki faction against the new alliance between Baz, Emir Bashir and Sheikh Bashir Jumblatt. For the next four years, the Yazbakis, led by the Imad clan, sponsored a rival Shihab emir to usurp the emirate, but failed each time. Most of the Druze sheikhs condemned the Imad clan in 1803 and rallied to Emir Bashir. Al-Jazzar died in 1804 and was ultimately succeeded by his former mamluk (manumitted slave soldier), Sulayman Pasha al-Adil.

=== Consolidation of power ===
With the relief of pressure from Sidon after al-Jazzar's death, Emir Bashir felt less reliant on Baz for maintaining power. Baz, meanwhile, had been asserting his influence in Mount Lebanon and often acted out of concert with Bashir, bypassing the latter's authority. Baz also formed an alliance with Maronite Patriarch Yusuf al-Tiyyan, to the chagrin of the Druze sheikhs, who perceived Baz's growing power as representative of the Maronite political upswing that grew at the expense of the Druze sheikhs, many of whom (including Sheikh Bashir Jumblatt), feared Baz. The Druze were also offended because Baz's power derived from his sponsorship by their overlord, Emir Bashir. The latter too had become irate over Baz's rising influence with the Ottoman governors, and felt particularly humiliated by Baz's canceling of a land survey of Keserwan ordered by Emir Hasan (Bashir's brother) and other humiliations regarding Baz's treatment of Emir Hasan. Bashir arranged to have Baz killed, recruiting Druze fighters from the Jumblatti and Yazbaki factions to commit the act. Thus, on 15 May 1807, Baz was ambushed and strangled on his way to Bashir's residence, while Bashir's Druze partisans occupied Jubail, killing Baz's brother and capturing and blinding Yusuf's sons. Afterward, Bashir sent assurances of loyalty to the governors of Tripoli and Sidon. Bashir also pressured Patriarch al-Tiyyan to step down.

With the elimination of Baz and Yusuf's sons, Emir Bashir consolidated his rule over Mount Lebanon. In 1810, Sulayman Pasha gave Bashir a leasehold for life over the Chouf and Keserwan tax districts, effectively making him the lifetime ruler of Mount Lebanon. (Note: In the meantime, Bashir Shihab II was vaccinated against smallpox, which was prevalent in the region.) Moreover, Sulayman Pasha would thereafter address Bashir in their correspondence with the honorary title of "pride of noble princes, authority over great lords, our noble son, Emir Bashir al-Shihabi". Circumstances that restricted his power at the time were the annual tax revenues due to Sulayman Pasha and the Jumblatt clan's domination over the other Druze sheikhs, who Sheikh Bashir protected from Emir Bashir's imposition of supplementary impositions.

The Maronite peasantry did not have such protection from Bashir's supplementary impositions, partly due to the loss of elite Maronite figures such as Baz and Patriarch Tiyyal, as well as the decline in power of the Maronite Khazen muqata'jis (subsidiary tax farmers, who were effectively enfeoffed feudal lords). The Maronite peasantry became frustrated with Emir Bashir because of the additional taxes imposed on them, while the Maronite Church was becoming increasingly angry at Emir Bashir's concealment of his Maronite Catholic faith. Bashir's behavior was influenced by the political environment of the time, during which the Ottoman state reasserted demonstration of its Sunni Islamic piety to counter the puritanical Sunni Wahhabi tribesmen who embarrassed the Ottomans by wresting control of Mecca in 1806. In concurrence with the Ottomans' suppression of the Wahhabi revolt in 1818 and Sheikh Bashir openly presenting himself as a Sunni Muslim, Emir Bashir instructed the members of the Shihab clan to publicly observe Ramadan in order not to be undermined by his chief Druze ally. By publicly partaking in a Muslim holiday, Emir Bashir deeply offended the Maronite Church.

=== Suppression of Maronite risings ===
In 1819, Abdullah Pasha succeeded Sulayman Pasha as the Acre-based governor of Sidon, and upon his accession to office, he demanded extra taxes from Bashir in the form of 1 million dirhams. Bashir understood this to be an attempt by Abdullah to foment a conflict between him and the inhabitants of Mount Lebanon, and he sought to defuse tensions with Abdullah Pasha. To that end, Bashir sent his mudabbir (adviser to an emir who promoted to the social rank of sheikh), Butrus Karami, to mediate his case with Abdullah, to which the latter responded by mobilizing his troops and entertaining ties with Bashir's Shihabi rivals. Bashir conceded to Abdullah's demand, and in order to gather funds for the payment, Bashir imposed a two-year advance on the jizya (poll tax for non-Muslims) and kharaj (land tax) on the Maronite peasants of Matn, Keserwan, Batroun and Jubail. He excluded the Druze muqata'jis from the same taxes. Bashir also passed on an additional charge by Abdullah Pasha for 50,000 dirhams to the Maronite peasants.

In reaction to Bashir's tax levies, the Maronite patriarch Yusuf Istifan rallied around 6,000 Maronite peasants to a summit by the Antelias stream, marking the start of the ammiya (popular uprising) movement. At Antelias, the peasants agreed to reject Bashir's additional impositions, and appointed wukala (delegates; sing. wakil) from each of their villages to represent their interests. The ammiya attracted the support of the Yazbaki chief, Ali Imad, two emirs from the Shihab clan and the Shia sheikhs. Abdullah Pasha, intent on removing Bashir from Mount Lebanon, also stood by the peasants in their demands not to pay anything more than the traditional annual taxes. Faced with this opposition, Bashir entered into self-exile to the Hauran under the protection of Damascus Eyalet's governor Dervish Pasha. Accompanying Emir Bashir were Sheikh Bashir Jumblatt and a number of emirs from the Arslan and Abu'l Lama clans. The Yazbaki faction, with Abdullah Pasha's blessing, proceeded to appoint two Sunni Muslim emirs from the Rashayya branch of the Shihab clan, Hasan and Salman, as Emir Bashir's successors on 14 April 1819.

By 1820, the Ottoman Empire was entering into war with Russia and attempting to quell a Greek uprising in Morea, prompting the Sublime Porte (Ottoman imperial government) to issue orders to Abdullah Pasha to fortify Syria's coastal cities and disarm Christians in his province. Abdullah Pasha believed only Emir Bashir was capable of fulfilling this task and sought to make way for his return to Mount Lebanon. To accomplish this, Abdullah Pasha ordered Hasan and Salman to promptly pay him 1.1 million dirhams, a seemingly insurmountable levy. At the same time, Emir Bashir's allies in Mount Lebanon undermined Hasan and Salman, while Emir Bashir entered Jezzine, in the environs of Deir al-Qamar. Due to these factors, Hasan and Salman ultimately conceded to step down in favor of Bashir after mediation by 'uqqal (Druze religious leaders). According to the agreement reached on 17 May 1820, a referendum would be held among the inhabitants of Mount Lebanon regarding leadership of the emirate. Before the referendum could be held, however, Abdullah Pasha restored Bashir's authority on the condition that he collect the jizya for the Sublime Porte.

The Maronite peasants and clergymen of Jubail, Bsharri and Batroun decided to take up armed resistance against Bashir's impositions, and garnered the support of the Shia Muslim Hamade sheikhs. The peasants proceeded to assemble at Lehfed, Haqil and Ehmej, while Shia villagers assembled at Ras Mishmish. They selected wukkal for their districts, called for fiscal equality with their Druze counterparts, and declared a revolt against Emir Bashir. Among the leading wukkal was historian Abu Khattar al-Aynturini, who promoted the idea that the Shihabi emirate was a conduit for Maronite solidarity. Emir Bashir enlisted the support of sheikhs Bashir and Hammud Abu Nakad. With their Druze fighters, Emir Bashir forces the Maronites in northern Mount Lebanon to submit to his orders. The episode augmented the growing chasm between an increasingly assertive Maronite community and the Druze muqata'jis and peasants. According to historian William Harris, the "ammiya, which expressed discordance between Bashir II's ambition and the interests of an increasingly coherent majority community, was a major step toward modern Lebanon. It represented the first peasant articulation of identity and the first demand for autonomy for Mount Lebanon."

=== Conflict with Damascus and suppression of the Jumblatt faction ===
In 1821, Bashir became entangled in a dispute between Abdullah Pasha and Dervish Pasha. The crisis was precipitated when the latter's mutasallim (deputy governor/tax collector) for the Beqaa Valley raided 'Aammiq, when the latter's inhabitants denied him entry into the village. Bashir attempted to mediate the dispute, and Dervish Pasha signaled his willingness to cede Damascus's traditional jurisdiction over the Beqaa Valley to Abdullah Pasha's Sidon Eyalet. Abdullah Pasha refused this offer and requested that Bashir take over the Beqaa Valley. Bashir accepted the task, albeit with reluctance, and under the command of his son Khalil, Bashir's forces swiftly conquered the region. Khalil was subsequently made mutasallim of the Beqaa Valley by Abdullah Pasha. In response, Dervish Pasha mobilized the support of the Yazbaki faction and a number of Shihabi emirs to reassert Damascene control over the area. However, Dervish Pasha's forces were defeated in the Anti-Lebanon Mountains and in the Hauran.

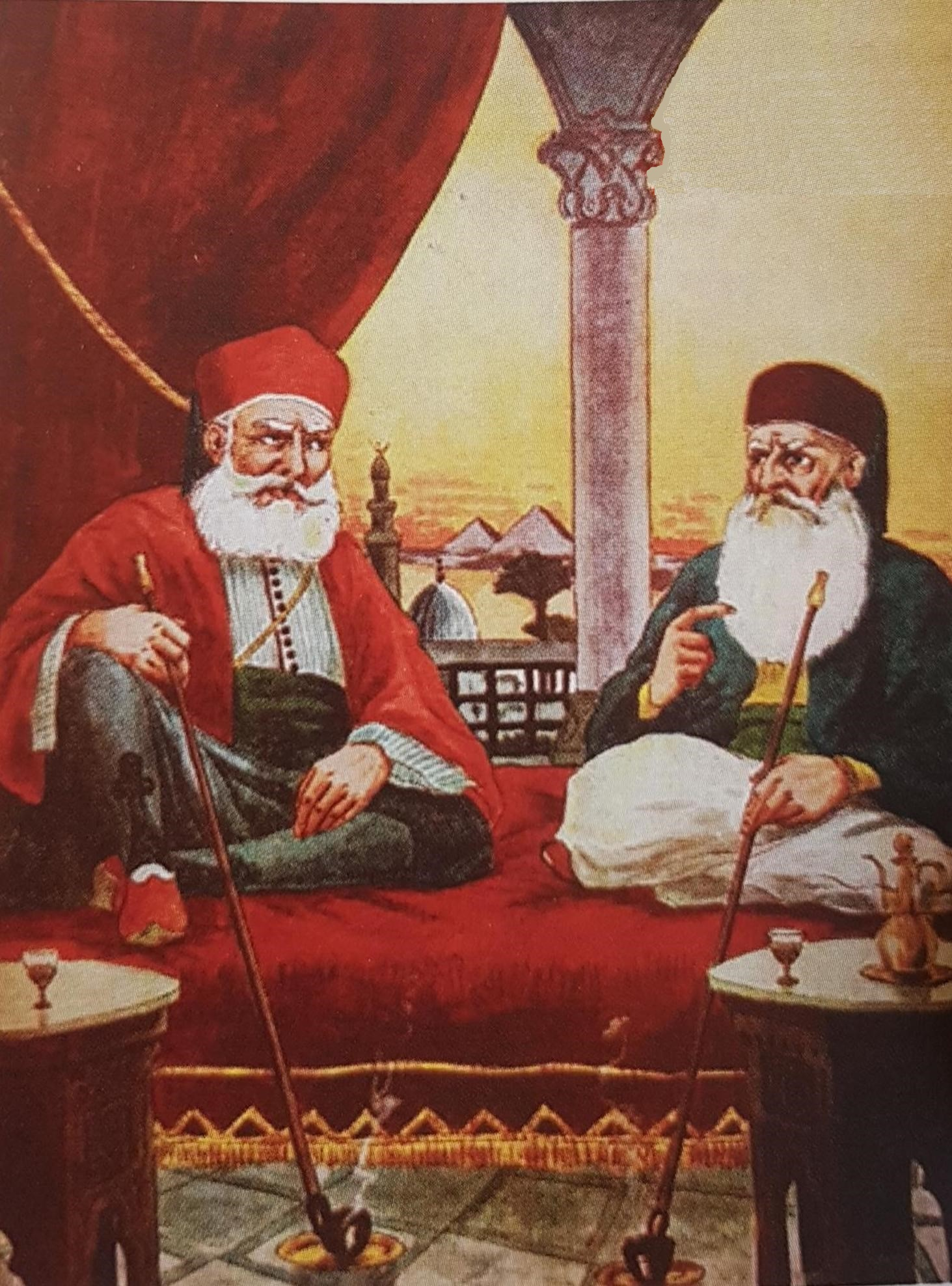
Muhammad Ali and Bashir II

The Sublime Porte was troubled by Abdullah Pasha and Emir Bashir's actions against Damascus, and dispatched Mustafa Pasha, the governor of Aleppo Eyalet, to reinforce Dervish Pasha and help him defeat Abdullah Pasha. Mustafa Pasha sent an emissary to Mount Lebanon to announce an imperial decree dismissing Bashir from the Mount Lebanon tax farms, and reappointing Hasan and Salman. Afterward, Mustafa Pasha, Dervish Pasha and the leaders of the Yazbaki Druze persuaded Sheikh Bashir to defect from Emir Bashir in return for replacing Hasan and Salman with Abbas As'ad Shihab, which officially occurred on 22 July 1821. The governors' forces, backed by the Druze, proceeded to besiege Abdullah Pasha's Acre headquarters, and Emir Bashir left Mount Lebanon for Egypt by sea on 6 August, having lost the backing of his most crucial ally, Sheikh Bashir. However, Emir Bashir gained a new, powerful ally in Egypt's virtually autonomous governor, Muhammad Ali. At the same time, Abdullah Pasha also requested support from Muhammad Ali, who saw in Emir Bashir and Abdullah Pasha the key to bringing Ottoman Syria under his hegemony. Muhammad Ali persuaded the Sublime Porte to issue pardons for Bashir and Abdullah Pasha, and to lift the siege on Acre in March 1822.

In return for Muhammad Ali's support, Bashir agreed to mobilize 4,000 fighters at the former's disposal upon request. Before returning to Mount Lebanon, Emir Bashir issued orders to Sheikh Bashir to pay a large sum of 1 million piasters in return for a pardon, but Sheikh Bashir instead opted for self-exile in the Hauran. From there, Sheikh Bashir began preparations for war with Emir Bashir. Sheikh Bashir struck an alliance with his Druze rival, Ali Imad, head of the Yazbaki faction, the Arslan clan, the Khazen sheikhs of Keserwan, and the Shihab emirs who were opposed to Emir Bashir's rule. With 7,000 armed supporters, Sheikh Bashir entered Beit el-Din in a demonstration of power to force Emir Bashir to reconcile with him. Emir Bashir continued to insist that Sheikh Bashir make the full payment to compensate for his betrayal, prompting unsuccessful mediation attempts by various Druze and Maronite sheikhs and Maronite bishop, Abdullah al-Bustani of Sidon. Emir Bashir and Sheikh Bashir thereafter readied for war.

Emir Bashir experienced a setback when he clashed with Sheikh Bashir's forces on 28 December 1824. However, this loss was reversed following Abdullah Pasha's dispatch of 500 Albanian irregulars to aid Emir Bashir on 2 January 1825. Upon the arrival of the reinforcements, Emir Bashir launched an attack and routed Sheikh Jumblatt's forces near the latter's headquarters at Moukhtara. Afterward, Sheikh Bashir and Imad fled for the Hauran, and Emir Bashir pardoned enemy fighters who surrendered. Imad and Sheikh Bashir were subsequently captured by the forces of Damascus's governor, with Imad being summarily executed and Sheikh Bashir being sent to Abdullah Pasha's custody in Acre. Upon request from Muhammad Ali, who sought to ensure Emir Bashir's reorganization of Mount Lebanon went unhindered, Abdullah Pasha had Sheikh Bashir executed on 11 June.

=== Centralization and shift to Maronite clergy ===
Emir Bashir proceeded to reorganize the tax farms (virtual fiefs) of Mount Lebanon to strengthen the hand of his remaining Druze allies and deny his enemies a fiscal power base. As such, the Jumblatts were dismissed from the tax districts of Chouf, Kharrub, Tuffah, Jezzine, Jabal al-Rihan and the eastern and western Beqaa Valley regions, which were redistributed to Bashir's son Khalil, the Talhuqs, and Nasif and Hammud Abu Nakad. Furthermore, the personal residences and orchards of the Jumblatt and Imad sheikhs were destroyed. Bashir's campaign prompted many Druze to leave for the Hauran to escape potential retribution.

To centralize his rule over the emirate (as opposed to the previous bipartite regime with Sheikh Bashir), Emir Bashir proceeded to assume control over legislative and judicial powers by setting up a defined legal code based on the Sharia law of the Ottoman state. Moreover, he transferred jurisdiction over civil and criminal affairs from the mostly Druze muqata'jis to three special qudah (judges; sing. qadi), whom he personally appointed. As such, he assigned a qadi in Deir al-Qamar in Chouf, who mostly oversaw the affairs of the Druze, and two Maronite clergymen who were based in Ghazir or Zouk Mikael in Keserwan and Zgharta in northern Mount Lebanon, respectively. Although the new legal code was based on Sharia, Bashir did not seek to overturn deeply-entrenched customary law, and the qudah typically relied on local customs in their judicial decisions, and only referred to the Sharia as a last resort.

Emir Bashir's alliance with Muhammad Ali and his falling out with Sheikh Bashir, under whose consent Emir Bashir had been able to rule Mount Lebanon for the preceding two decades, marked a major turning point in Emir Bashir's political career. Emir Bashir's loss of Druze support and his subsequent destruction of their feudal power paved the way for the strengthening of his ties with the Maronite Church. Moreover, Bashir looked to the Maronite clergy as the natural alternative to substitute the Druze in his new, highly centralized administration. Concurrently, he became more at ease with embracing his Christian faith since he no longer depended on Druze support. Patriarch Yusuf Hubaysh greatly welcomed the aforementioned developments.

Between 1825 and his removal from office in 1840, Bashir installed Maronite patriarchs, bishops, and lower-ranked priests as the principal functionaries of his administration and as advisers. In effect, Maronite clergymen, who had long dominated the religious and secular aspects of Maronite life, acquired the privileges that the Druze muqata'jis had previously maintained with Bashir and his Shihabi predecessors. The lower-ranked clergymen in particular obtained Bashir's sponsorship to help them rise through the hierarchy of the Maronite Church in return for their support and their efforts to promote loyalty and love for Bashir among the Maronite peasantry. These clergymen were also at the forefront of efforts to roll back the excesses imposed on Maronite tenants from their Druze lords and the latter's influence in the tax districts in general. Meanwhile, the remaining Druze muqata'jis continued to serve as the leaders of a Druze community that was increasingly resentful of Maronite ascendancy at the expense of Druze power. As a consequence of this situation, communal tensions between the Druze and the Maronites grew further. Throughout this period, the Ottoman government permitted Bashir's patronage of Maronite domination in Mount Lebanon.

=== Peak of power under Egyptian rule ===
Muhammad Ali sought to annex Syria, and as a pretext to invade the region, he published a list of complaints against Abdullah Pasha, who in turn received the support of Sultan Mahmud II. The latter had the mufti of Istanbul issue a fatwa (Islamic edict) that declared Muhammad Ali an infidel, while Muhammad Ali had the Sharif of Mecca issue a fatwa that condemned Mahmud II for violating the Sharia and promoted Muhammad Ali as Islam's savior, subsequently setting the stage for war between Egypt and Istanbul. Under the command of Muhammad Ali's son Ibrahim Pasha, Egyptian forces began their conquest of Syria on 1 October 1831, capturing much of Palestine before besieging Abdullah Pasha in Acre on 11 November. Bashir faced a dilemma amid these developments as both Abdullah Pasha and Ibrahim Pasha sent emissaries requesting his support.

Bashir initially hesitated in choosing sides, but once he received word that Ibrahim Pasha was prepared to mobilize six of his regiments to devastate Mount Lebanon and its lucrative silk industry, and that Sheikh Bashir Jumblatt's sons Nu'man and Sa'id had made their way to Ibrahim Pasha's camp to pledge their allegiance, Bashir deferred to the Egyptians. He ultimately concluded that Muhammad Ali was stronger and more progressive than the Sublime Porte and believed he would risk losing his emirate by challenging the Egyptians. Moreover, his Maronite and Melkite allies also favored Egypt because of its centrality to eastern Mediterranean commerce and the religious egalitarianism of Muhammad Ali. Meanwhile, under the Sublime Porte's orders, the mutasallims of Beirut and Sidon and the walis of Tripoli and Aleppo stood by Abdullah Pasha, and issued warnings to Mount Lebanon's notables to do likewise. Bashir attempted to rally his Druze allies and rivals, such as Hammud Abu Nakad and several Jumblatt, Talhuq, Abd al-Malik, Imad and Arslan sheikhs, to defect to Muhammad Ali. Instead, they joined the Ottoman army mobilizing in Damascus under the command of the serasker (commander-in-chief), Mehmed Izzet Pasha. The latter issued a decree condemning Bashir as a rebel and replacing him with Nu'man Jumblatt.

The alignment of the major Druze clans with the Ottomans compelled Bashir to further rely on his growing Maronite power base. He subsequently directed Bishop Abdullah al-Bustani to appoint a Maronite military commander for each district, but to do so discreetly to avoid provoking a Druze backlash. The Maronite commanders were tasked with tax collection, which was traditionally the responsibility of the mostly Druze muqata'jis, and to arm Maronite peasant fighters to suppress Druze dissent in Mount Lebanon. Concurrently, Bashir also had the properties of the pro-Ottoman Druze muqata'jis attacked or seized. On 21 May 1832, Egyptian forces captured Acre. Afterward, Bashir and Patriarch Hubaysh were ordered by Ibrahim Pasha to prepare their mostly Maronite troops for an assault against Damascus. Bashir's troops were commanded by his son Khalil, and together with the Egyptian army, they captured Damascus without resistance on 16 June, before routing the Ottoman army at Homs on 9 July. Khalil had previously fought alongside Ibrahim Pasha in Acre and Jerusalem. Khalil and his troops also participated in the Egyptian victory at Konya in southwestern Anatolia on 27 December.

With Syria conquered, Muhammad Ali launched a centralization effort in the region, abolishing the eyalets (provinces) of Damascus, Aleppo, Tripoli and Sidon (including Mount Lebanon) and replacing them with a single governorship based in Damascus. However, through his close alliance with Muhammad Ali, Bashir maintained his direct authority over the Mount Lebanon Emirate, preventing it from being subject to the Egyptian bureaucracy that centralized power in the rest of Syria. Moreover, he was offered the governorship of "Arabistan" (the territories of Syria), but declined to assume leadership over the region, which was then transferred to Muhammad Sharif Pasha. In 1832, Muhammad Ali rewarded Bashir by extending the latter's jurisdiction to include Jabal Amil, which Bashir assigned to his youngest son Majid, the northern tax district of Koura and the port cities of Sidon and Beirut. The latter had become the commercial outlet for Mount Lebanon's silk industry, Acre's successor as the political center of the Syrian coast and a principal residence for Egyptian officials, European consuls and Christian and Sunni Muslim merchants. Bashir was entrusted with police power over Mount Lebanon and the plains around Damascus. The expansion of his jurisdiction enriched Bashir with increased revenues to the point that his tribute from Syria was four times larger than that of Muhammad Ali.

As part of Muhammad Ali's centralization efforts, tax collection was official transferred from muqata'jis to the appointees of the central authorities in 1833/34. Bashir took advantage of this measure by confiscating the estates of the muqata'jis and assigning his relatives as the mutasallims of the various tax districts. As such, he appointed Khalil to Shahhar, Qasim to Chouf, Amin in Jubail, his brother Hasan's son Abdullah in Keserwan, his cousin Bashir in Tuffah and his associate Haydar Abu'l Lama in Matn.

=== Suppression of revolts throughout Syria ===
Bashir suppressed several revolts against Muhammad Ali's conscription and disarmament policies in the mountainous regions throughout Syria in the service of Ibrahim Pasha. Because of Bashir's support for Muhammad Ali, his forces and allies in Mount Lebanon were allowed to keep their arms. The first major revolt suppressed was the peasants' revolt in Palestine, during which Muhammad Ali sent orders to Bashir to advance against Safad, one of the centers of the rebellion. Accordingly, Bashir led his troops toward the town, but before reaching it, he issued an ultimatum to the rebels demanding their surrender. The rebels sent a certain Sheikh Salih al-Tarshihi to negotiate terms with Bashir, and they ultimately agreed to surrender after another meeting with Bashir in Bint Jbeil. Bashir's Druze forces under the command of his son Amin, entered Safad without resistance on 18 July, making way for the displaced residents from its Jewish quarter to return. Between 1834 and 1835, Bashir's forces commanded by Khalil and his relatives also participated in the suppression of revolts in Akkar, Safita, the Krak des Chevaliers and an Alawite revolt in the mountainous region of Latakia. With the various rebellions quelled, resistance to disarmament and conscription by Muhammad Ali's administration was stifled for a few years.

Muhammad Ali's position in Syria was shaken again in 1838, during the Druze revolt in Hauran, which attracted the support of the Jumblatt and Imad sheikhs of Mount Lebanon and Wadi al-Taym. The Shihab emirs of Hasbaya, Ahmad and Sa'd al-Din, were commissioned to put down the Druze rebels in Wadi al-Taym led by Shibli al-Uryan, while Bashir was ordered to mobilize a Christian force in April. Bashir acceded to Ibrahim Pasha's levy request, organizing a force under the leadership of his grandson Mahmud, which subsequently was sent to reinforce Ahmad and Sa'd ad-Din in Hasbaya. Bashir's troops were ambushed by Druze forces commanded by rival Shihab emirs, Bashir Qasim and Ali of Rashaya. Khalil and his Christian troops later came to Mahmud's aid, forcing the flight of Shibli to Hauran. Khalil and Ibrahim Pasha later routed the forces of Nasir ad-Din Imad and Hasan Jumblatt in July. A month later, Ibrahim Pasha and Shibli negotiated an end to the revolt, whereby the Druze would be exempted from conscription, corvée and additional taxes. The Christians of Mount Lebanon were rewarded for their support for Ibrahim Pasha with the distribution of 16,000 rifles. By the revolt's end, tensions between Christians and Druze were further heightened as the two sects mostly fought on opposing sides.

The Ottomans and British took advantage of Egypt's severely weakened position in Syria due to the heavy loss of troops and skilled officers in the 1838 revolt. After two years of diplomatic wrangling between Muhammad Ali, the Ottomans, Great Britain, France, and Russia, a war effort by an Ottoman–European alliance against Muhammad Ali's control over Syria was launched. Bashir's Druze and Christian rivals and dissidents to his rule in Mount Lebanon were courted and armed in an initiative by the British Foreign Secretary, Lord Palmerston. With British–Ottoman support, an alliance of sheikhs in Mount Lebanon, including the Abu Nakad, Abu'l Lama, Khazen, Shihab, Hubaysh and Dahdah clans, Khanjar al-Harfush, Ahmad Daghir, Yusuf al-Shantiri and Abu Samra Ghanim, launched a rebellion against Bashir and Ibrahim Pasha on 27 May 1840. Bashir managed to temporarily suppress the revolt by confiscating property from the rebels, issuing threats and offering tax reductions to uninvolved Druze sheikhs in return for their support. Most Druze did not join the revolt in its early stage due to its mostly Maronite or pro-Christian leadership based in Matn, Keserwan and the Sahil. By 13 July, Bashir informed the Egyptian authorities that the revolt was suppressed, and handed over 57 of the revolt's leaders and participants, including Haydar Abu'l Lama and Fransis al-Khazen, who were exiled to Upper Egypt. Bashir also had his sons and subordinate commanders collect the rebels' arms and redistribute most of them to his ally and kinsmen, Sa'd al-Din of Hasbaya.

=== Fall and exile ===
A European alliance consisting of Great Britain, Prussia, Russia and Austria backed the Ottomans, and through the British consul in Beirut, Richard Wood, sought to persuade Bashir to defect from Muhammad Ali in August 1840. This was after Wood, who had been accorded responsibility over settling Mount Lebanon's affairs by the Ottomans, had won over Patriarch Hubaysh with guarantees that the Ottomans would respect the privileges of the Maronite Church in Mount Lebanon. Bashir had previously been informed by the French consul that French expeditionary troops were set to land in Beirut to back Ibrahim Pasha, who by then maintained a force of 33,000 troops across Mount Lebanon under the command of Sulayman Pasha. Bashir maintained his loyalty to Muhammad Ali and rejected a total of three offers by Wood to defect to the Ottomans, including a warning by British diplomat Lord Ponsonby that Bashir should "make haste to return to your [duty] to the Sultan". The third offer by Wood came with a warning that British–Ottoman forces were on the verge of launching an assault on the Egyptians in Syria.

Meanwhile, Bashir's nephew, Abdullah Shihab of Keserwan, defected to the Ottomans, along with the Khazen and Hubaysh sheikhs after the Ottomans offered to compensate them and their subordinates with tax relief for their revolt against Bashir a few months prior and after realizing that French support for Muhammad Ali was limited to the diplomatic realm. Abu Samra and the Maronites of Batroun, Jubail, Bsharri and Koura also defected from the Ottomans. Allied European and Ottoman forces began the naval bombardment of Beirut on 11 September, while the forces of Bashir's cousin, Bashir Qasim of Rashaya, attacked Sulayman Pasha's forces in Beirut, Sidon and Acre. While Ibrahim Pasha headed for Mount Lebanon from northern Syria, allied forces set up headquarters in Jounieh, north of Beirut, and began distributing weapons to Bashir Qasim's rebels. By 25 September, allied forces had captured Beirut, Sidon and Haifa, Tyre, cutting off Egyptian sea access to Ibrahim Pasha's troops.

Still unable to solicit Bashir's defection, Sultan Abdülmecid I issued a firman (imperial decree) replacing Bashir with Bashir Qasim on 8 October. After a failed attempt to woo the Druze sheikhs to his side by promising them complete control of Keserwan, Ibrahim Pasha fled, while Bashir surrendered to the Ottomans on 11 October. Bashir offered the Ottomans four million piasters to be exiled to France, but his offer was rejected. Instead, he was given the choice between exile in Malta or London. Bashir chose the former, and departed Beirut for Malta, bringing with him Jihan, all of his children and grandchildren, his mudabbir Butros Karama, Bishop Istifan Hubaysh, Rustom Baz and 113 retainers. After an eleven-month stay in Malta, they departed again for Istanbul. Bashir remained in Istanbul until his death in 1850. He was buried in the Armenian Church in the Galata district of the city.

== Legacy ==
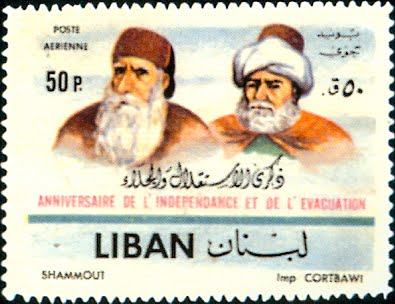
A 1961 Lebanese stamp portraying Bashir Shihab II (left) and Fakhr al-Din II (right) in commemoration of Lebanon's independence in 1946

Bashir was the strongest of the Shihabi grand emirs, but his forty-year rule, together with outside pressures from the Ottoman imperial and provincial authorities and the European powers, caused the Shihabi emirate's undoing. Bashir overturned the traditional system of governance in Mount Lebanon by nearly eliminating the feudal authority of the Druze and Maronite muqata'jis, the secular Maronite leadership, and the political strength of the Druze leadership in general, which had long formed the wellspring of the emirate's power. Bashir's rule concurrently brought about the development of sectarianism in Mount Lebanon's politics. This first manifested itself during the Maronite ammiya movement against Bashir's tax exactions in 1820, and/or with Bashir's elimination of Bashir Jumblatt and subsequent cultivation of the Maronite clergy as a new power base to replace the mostly Druze muqata'jis. Jumblatt's execution endowed Bashir with undisputed political power in Mount Lebanon and was done out of political considerations, but was seen by the Druze community as an attempt by a Christian to eliminate the Druze. Popular feelings of sectarian animosity were aggravated during Egyptian rule when Bashir utilized Maronite fighters to quell Druze risings, and later used Druze fighters to suppress Maronite risings towards the end of the Egyptian period. Historian William Harris summarizes that Bashir contributed to the creation of the modern state of Lebanon, writing:

For good or bad, and whatever his personal responsibility, Bashir II's half-century bequeathed the beginnings of modern Lebanon. These included the idea of an autonomous Lebanese entity, popular identification with sectarian community above loyalty to local lords, popular communal political representation, and sectarian tensions.

Bashir also overturned another aspect of the "social contract" in Mount Lebanon by "serving the interests of outsiders against those of his own people", according to Lebanese historian Leila Fawaz. Moreover, his reliance on the Ottoman governors of Sidon and his heavy involvement in their political struggles with the other governors of Ottoman Syria turned Mount Lebanon into "a pawn of regional politics beyond its control". Historian Caesar E. Farah asserts,

Without the domestic schemes of Bashir, which facilitated the Egyptian occupation of Syria, the Lebanon presumably would not have become in 1840 the cockpit of the great powers. While he may not have created the question, Bashir did convert the country into the fulcrum for the disruption of Ottoman rule in the Syrian provinces. He not only ended the primacy of his house, but also prepared the country to be the apple of discord cast to the nations of the West.

Today, the Shihab family (also spelled "Chehab") remains one of the prominent families of Lebanon. The third president of the Lebanese Republic, Fuad Chehab, was a member of the family, descending from the Ghazir-based, Maronite line of Hasan, Bashir II's brother, as was former Prime Minister Khaled Chehab, who descended from the Hasbaya-based, Sunni Muslim branch of the family. Descendants of Bashir II live in Turkey and are known as the Paksoy family due to Turkish restrictions on non-Turkish surnames.

== Monuments ==
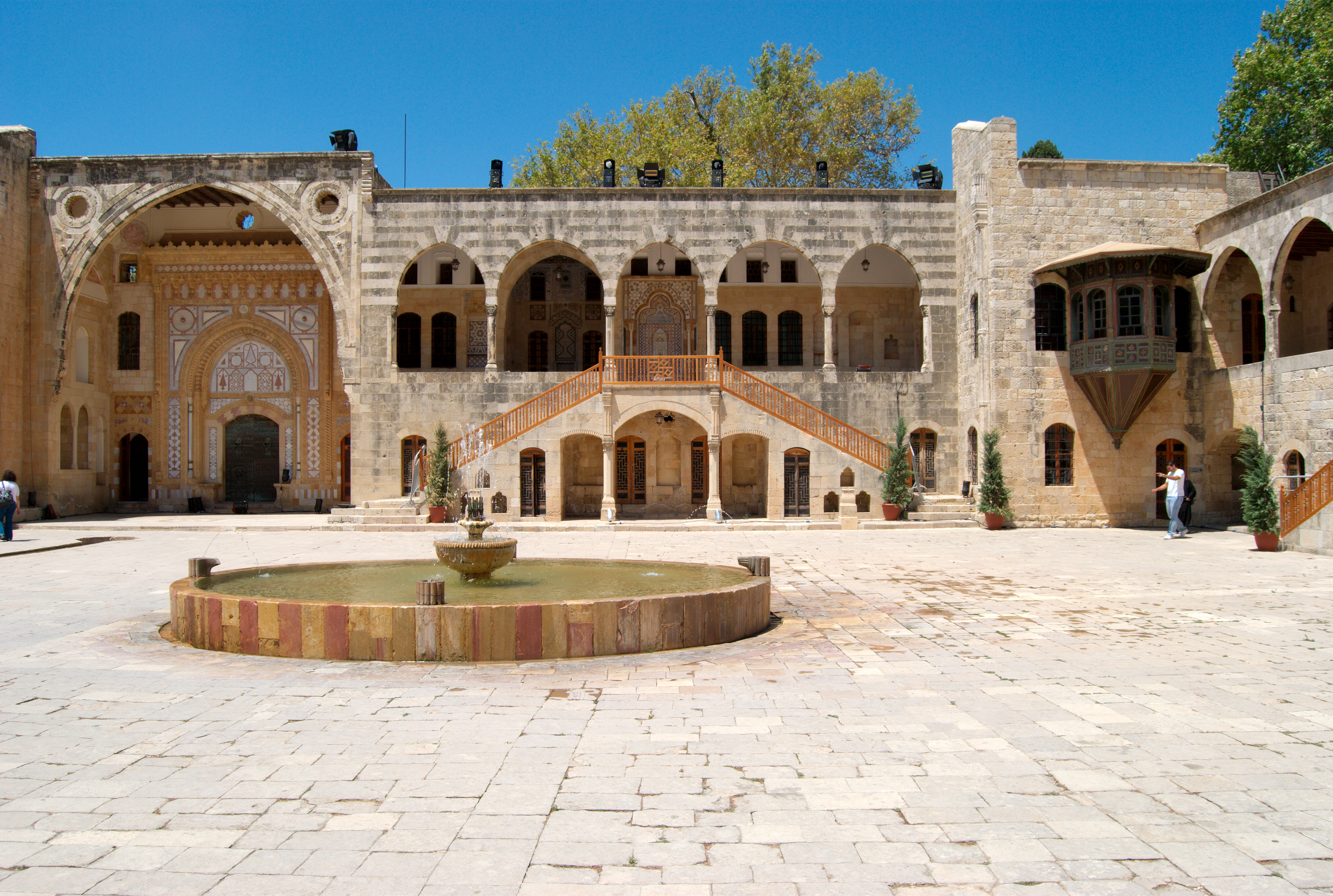
Inner courtyard of Beiteddine Palace

One of the most remarkable of Bashir's monuments is Beiteddine Palace in Beit ed-Dine, which he started building immediately after taking power in 1788. Legend has it that Bashir rewarded the architect by cutting his hands off in order to keep his palace a one-of-a-kind.

== See also ==
- History of Lebanon under Ottoman rule
- Mustafa Agha Barbar

== Bibliography ==
- Abu Izzeddin, Nejla M. (1993). The Druzes: A New Study of Their History, Faith, and Society. Brill. ISBN 9789004097056.
- Dau, Butros (1984). History of the Maronites: Religious, Cultural, and Political. Butros Dau.
- Farah, Caesar E.; Centre for Lebanese Studies (Great Britain) (2000). Politics of Interventionism in Ottoman Lebanon, 1830–1861. I. B. Tauris. ISBN 9781860640568.
- Fawaz, L.T. (1994). An Occasion for War: Civil Conflict in Lebanon and Damascus in 1860. University of California Press. ISBN 9780520087828.
- Harris, William (2012). Lebanon: A History, 600–2011. Oxford University Press. ISBN 9780195181111.
- Khairallah, Shereen (1996). The Sisters of Men: Lebanese Women in History. Institute for Women Studies in the Arab World.
- Makdisi, Ussama Samir (2000). The Culture of Sectarianism: Community, History, and Violence in Nineteenth-Century Ottoman Lebanon. University of California Press. ISBN 9780520922792.
- Mishaqa, Mikhail (1988). Murder, Mayhem, Pillage, and Plunder: The History of the Lebanon in the 18th and 19th Centuries by Mikhayil Mishaqa (1800–1873). Translated by Thackston, Wheeler McIntosh. State University of New York Press. ISBN 9780887067129.
- Salibi, Kamal (1992) [first published in 1965]. Histoire du Liban du XVIIeme siècle à nos jours [The Modern History of Lebanon] (in French). Translated by Besse, Sylvie (2nd ed.). Beirut: Naufal. ISBN 9782906958128.
- Ufford, Letitia W. (2007). The Pasha: How Mehemet Ali Defied the West, 1839–1841. McFarland. ISBN 9780786428939.

Preceded by Yusuf Shihab	Emir of Mount Lebanon; 1789–1842	Succeeded by Bashir Shihab III
