= Yusuf Shihab =

Yusuf Shihab يوسف الشهابي

Emir of Mount Lebanon
- Reign: 1770–1789
- Predecessor: Mansur Shihab
- Successor: Bashir Shihab II
- Born: 1748
- Died: 1790 (aged 41–42); Acre
- Issue: Sa'ad el-Din (son); Haydar III (son)
- Dynasty: Shihab dynasty
- Father: Mulhim Shihab
- Religion: Maronite Catholic (in practice); Sunni Islam (nominally)

Yusuf Shihab (Arabic: يوسف الشهابي) (1748–1790) was the autonomous emir of Mount Lebanon between 1770 and 1789. He was the fifth consecutive member of the Shihab dynasty to govern Mount Lebanon.

== Family ==
Yusuf Shihab was the son of the emir (prince) Mulhim. They were the leaders of the Shihab dynasty. The Shihabs were descendants of the Ma'n dynasty of Fakhr ad-Din. The first emir of the dynasty, Haydar al-Shihab, succeeded the last Ma'n emir of Mount Lebanon in 1697. Haydar al-Shihab was a Sunni Muslim, although his mother was Druze. His kinship with the Ma'ns allowed for him to serve as the eminent leader of the Druze clans of Mount Lebanon. The Shihabs were generally not religious and embraced their faith nominally, some were Sunni Muslims or Druze, and later other members became Maronite Catholics. Yusuf was raised as a Maronite Christian, but was publicly a Sunni Muslim. During Yusuf's rule, many members of the Shihab family converted to Christianity and Yusuf also began to rely on the support of the Maronite Christians.

== Rule ==
=== Power base in north Lebanon ===
In 1753, Mulhim was ill and unable to govern. This led to a rivalry over succession between his brothers Ahmad and Mansur, while Mulhim and his nephew Qasim sought to prevent either from assuming control over the emirate. When Mulhim died in 1759, Qasim became the administrator of the Chouf district, although after paying a bribe, this authority was transferred to Ahmad and Mansur. The two brothers engaged in conflict in which Yusuf supported Ahmad. Mansur prevailed by 1763, and Yusuf fled the Chouf to Mukhtara, the headquarters of the powerful Druze Jumblatt clan. Ali Jumblatt, an ally of Mansur, protected Yusuf and offered to mediate the dispute between the two. After Mansur refused Ali Jumblatt's offer and seized Yusuf's properties, Ali switched allegiance and backed Yusuf in his struggle for control of the emirate.

Also in 1763, a 16-year-old Yusuf, under the mentorship of his Maronite manager Sa'ad al-Khuri and with the political support of the governor Muhammad Pasha al-Kurji of Tripoli, led the Sunni Muslim and Maronite peasants of the Tripoli countryside in an uprising that drove out the Hamade landlords, who were Shia Muslims. Thereafter, Muhammad Pasha appointed Yusuf as administrator of Batroun and Jubail. Yusuf's acquisition of Hamade territory not only provided him a solid power base from which to fight Mansur, but also provided him with the Hamades' former role as patrons of the local Maronite clergy. This further strengthened their relationship with the Maronites since Yusuf already had the support of the Khazen family of Keserwan, a prominent Maronite family.

=== Emir of Mount Lebanon ===
In 1768, a strong alliance was established between Sheikh Nasif al-Nassar, the sheikh of the Metawali (Shia Muslim) clans of Jabal Amil in south Lebanon, and Sheikh Daher al-Umar, the Arab strongman of the Galilee and northern Palestine and head of the Zaydan family. Together, they carved out a territory practically independent of Ottoman authority. Mansur allied himself with them against the Ottoman governors of Sidon and Damascus, while Yusuf supported the Ottomans. Mansur backed Daher and Nasif in their alliance with Ali Bey al-Kabir of Egypt. Ali Bey dispatched his commander Abu al-Dhahab to launch an invasion of Damascus in 1770. When Abu al-Dahab suddenly withdrew from Damascus after defeating its governor Uthman Pasha al-Kurji, Mansur's position became vulnerable when Uthman Pasha resumed the governorship. The Druze clans of Mount Lebanon withdrew their backing for Mansur and Uthman Pasha transferred his governorship of Chouf to his loyalist Emir Yusuf. Uthman Pasha officially appointed Yusuf as emir of Mount Lebanon. Together with Uthman Pasha and his sons (Darwish Pasha, governor of Sidon and Muhammad Pasha, governor of Tripoli), Yusuf sought to push Daher and his Metawali allies out of Sidon, which they briefly occupied during the Egyptian invasion of Ottoman Syria.

Emir Yusuf led an offensive against Nasif and Daher in late 1771, but was decisively defeated. He failed to arrive and support Uthman Pasha when the latter attempted to launch an invasion of Galilee, but was routed by Daher's forces at the Battle of Lake Hula. Yusuf sought to compensate for this loss by launching a campaign against the Metawalis at Nabatieh, but was routed by the Zaydani-Metawali alliance, losting some 1,500 of his Druze soldiers. Following their victory against Emir Yusuf, the allies captured Sidon from Darwish Pasha. Yusuf and Uthman Pasha attempted to wrest back control of Sidon by assembling a troops backed by artillery and commanded by Ottoman officer Jezzar Pasha. The siege failed when the Russian Navy entered the conflict to back their ally Daher. After Yusuf's troops were bombarded by Russian ships, Daher and Nasif's troops drove them out of the area and pursued them to Beirut, which the Russians also began to bombard until Yusuf paid their admiral to cease their fire.

By 1772, Daher and his allies were firmly in control of Sidon. In order to prevent further encroachments in Lebanon by Daher, Yusuf requested the assistance of Jezzar Pasha, an Ottoman officer. Yusuf turned down a bribe of 200,000 Spanish reales from Abu al-Dahab to betray Jezzar and execute him. Jezzar Pasha soon consolidated his own rule in Beirut and ignored agreements he had made with Yusuf regarding the latter's authority in the city. Yusuf and his Druze soldiers subsequently tried to dislodge Jezzar Pasha, but were unable to. Thus, Yusuf requested help from his erstwhile enemy, Daher al-Umar, via his uncle Mansur who he had previously struggled against and replaced. Daher accepted the request and had his Russian allies bombard Beirut by sea on Yusuf's behalf until Jezzar surrendered and fled. Daher's backing became handy once again when Yusuf's authority over the Beqaa Valley was challenged by the governor of Damascus in 1773. Yusuf's brother, Sayyid Ahmad, who had been the governor of Beqaa at the time, had robbed traveling merchants from Damascus in the Beqaa village of Qabb Ilyas. Yusuf removed him from the Beqaa and was appointed in his place.

Jezzar Pasha became the governor of Sidon in 1776 after the Ottomans' elimination of Daher al-Umar. Yusuf was confirmed as the governor of Beirut, Chouf, Beqaa and Jubail. Moreover, Hasan Pasha, the Ottoman kapudan (commander of the Ottoman Navy) who led the offensive against Daher in 1775, declared that Governor of Sidon's authority over Yusuf was limited to the collection of the miri (Hajj tax). However, Jezzar Pasha ignored this order and took over Beirut in 1776 with the demand that Yusuf pay three years worth of miri tax. Jezzar was later driven out by the Ottoman Navy. Nassar was captured and executed by Jezzar in 1780.

=== Downfall ===
Yusuf and his brothers Sid Ahmad and Effendi engaged in a long power struggle during the late 1770s and 1780s. Jezzar Pasha took advantage of this situation and gave his support to whichever brother paid him the highest bribe. Ali Jumblatt, Yusuf's former ally, died in 1778 and the Jumblatt family gave their backing to Sayyid Ahmad and Effendi. Yusuf withdrew from the Chouf to Ghazir. With the backing of the Ra'ad family and the Kurdish Mir'ibi family (both Sunni Muslim families), he entered into armed conflict with his two brothers. He regained control of Chouf after paying off Jezzar Pasha. In 1780, Effendi was killed in an attack his forces launched to assassinate Yusuf's top confidant, Sa'ad al-Khuri. Sayyid Ahmad then mobilized his Jumblatt and Yazbak allies against Yusuf, but after the latter bribed the Yazbaks with 300,000 qirsh, Sayyid Ahmad's force fell apart. In 1783 and on Jezzar Pasha's orders, Yusuf took over Marjayoun from his maternal uncle Isma'il Shihab. Jezzar had accused Isma'il of responsibility in the death of a Jewish merchant. Jezzar sought to divide and conquer Mount Lebanon and thus when Isma'il Shihab offered to pay a higher tax rate if he restored his authority in Marjayoun, Jezzar accepted. The new alliance between Jezzar, Isma'il, Sayyid Ahmad and the Jumblatts forced Yusuf to flee Mount Lebanon for the Jabal al-Ansariyah.

Jezzar then offered Yusuf safe passage if he returned to Beirut, but when the latter returned he was arrested by Jezzar's troops who transported him to Jezzar's headquarters in Acre where he was imprisoned. Sayyid Ahmad and Isma'il offered Jezzar 500,000 qirsh to execute Yusuf, but Yusuf countered with 1,000,000 qirsh to release and return him to Mount Lebanon. Jezzar accepted Yusuf's offer and, upon his return to Mount Lebanon, Yusuf had Isma'il arrested and imposed a large financial penalty on the Jumblatts. Isma'il died in custody shortly after. Around this time, Sa'ad al-Khuri was arrested by Jezzar for ransom, but he too died in custody after becoming sick.

In 1788, Jezzar Pasha demanded that Yusuf pay off the bribe he had promised him in 1783, but Yusuf refused. Consequently, Jezzar threw his support to Ali Shihab, Isma'il's son, in his bid to eliminate Emir Yusuf, who in turn backed an uprising against Jezzar in Acre. After Jezzar suppressed the revolt, Ali launched an offensive against Yusuf's holding in the Beqaa Valley, but was repelled by Yusuf's brother Haydar. However, Jezzar Pasha arrived to support Ali, and their combined 2,000-strong force moved against Haydar, whose forces after the desertion of the Harfush clan consisted of 700 cavalry from the Shihab and Abi Lama clans and disgruntled mercenaries of Jezzar. Jezzar Pasha decisively defeated Emir Yusuf at Jubb Janin in south Beqaa.

Following his 1788 defeat, Yusuf appealed to the Druze clans for safety in return for surrendering authority over Mount Lebanon. Bashir Shihab II, a distant cousin and ally of Ali al-Shihab, was given official control over Mount Lebanon by Jezzar Pasha in September 1789. Bashir II sought to eliminate Yusuf to remove any potential threats to his position and his forces defeated Yusuf's retinue of supporters in the Munaytara hills of north Lebanon. Yusuf was protected by the governors of Tripoli and Damascus. However, Jezzar Pasha once again offered Yusuf an opportunity to reclaim his emirate, but sometime after he arrived in Acre, Bashir II managed to persuade Jezzar Pasha that Yusuf only sought to sow sedition among the clans of Mount Lebanon. Jezzar then had Yusuf executed in 1790.

== Bibliography ==
- Harris, William (2012). Lebanon: A History, 600–2011. OUP USA. ISBN 978-0-19-518111-1.
- Joudah, Ahmad Hasan (1987). Revolt in Palestine in the Eighteenth Century: The Era of Shaykh Zahir Al-ʻUmar. Kingston Press. ISBN 978-0-940670-11-2.
- Van Leeuwen, Richard (1994). Notables and Clergy in Mount Lebanon: The Khāzin Sheikhs and the Maronite Church, 1736–1840. BRILL. ISBN 9789004099784.
- Masters, Bruce (2013). The Arabs of the Ottoman Empire, 1516–1918: A Social and Cultural History. Cambridge University Press. ISBN 978-1-107-06779-0.
- Philipp, T. (2013). Acre: The Rise and Fall of a Palestinian City, 1730–1831. Columbia University Press. ISBN 978-0-231-50603-8.
- Salibi, Kamal S. (1981). "Djazzar Pasha". In William Charles Brice (ed.). An Historical Atlas of Islam. BRILL. ISBN 9789004061163.

Preceded by Mansur Shihab	Emir of Mount Lebanon; 1770–1789	Succeeded by Bashir Shihab II
