= Kaymakam =

Title for a district governor in Turkey, Northern Cyprus, Lebanon and the Ottoman Empire

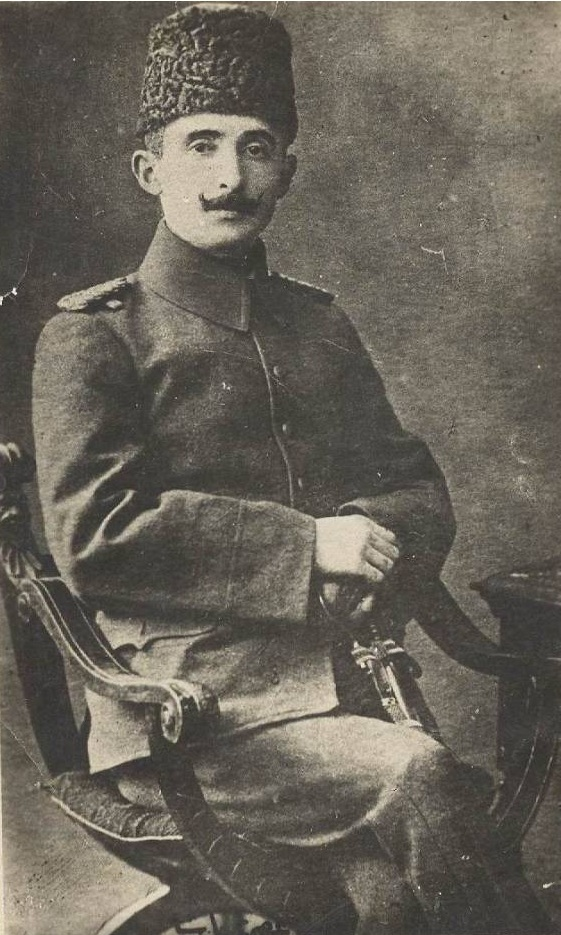
Binbashi Ismet Pasha, who later became a Kaymakam, after returning from Yemen.

Kaymakam, also known by many other romanizations, was a title used by various officials of the Ottoman Empire, including acting grand viziers, governors of provincial sanjaks, and administrators of district kazas. The title has been retained and is sometimes used without translation for provincial or subdistrict governors in various Ottoman successor states, including the Republic of Turkey, Kuwait, Iraq, and Lebanon.

== Names ==
The title has been romanized in English since 1645 with extremely numerous spelling variations. The most common present-day forms are kaymakam, kaimakam, and qaimaqam. The modern Turkish term is kaymakam, from Ottoman Turkish kaymakam (قایمقام), from Arabic qāʾim maqām (قَائِم مَقَام), meaning "stand in" or "deputy".

== History ==
=== Ottoman Empire ===
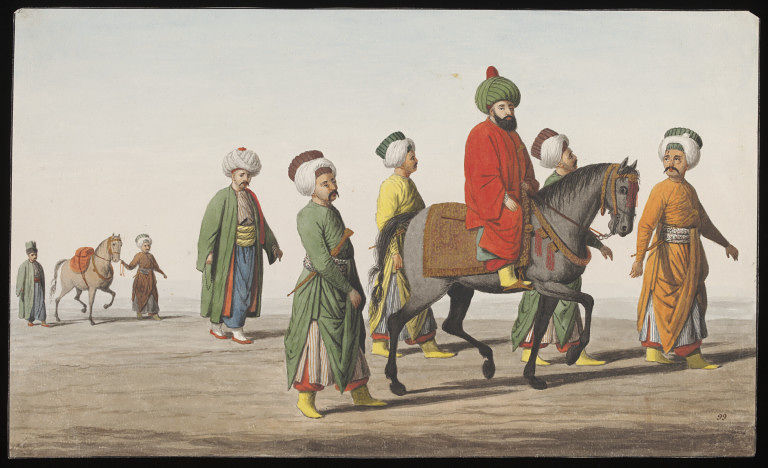
The kaymakam in Constantinople with his attendants, anonymous Greek painter, ca. 1809

In the Ottoman Empire, the title of kaymakam (known either as sadâret kaymakamı or as kaymakam pasha) was originally used for the official deputizing for the Grand Vizier during the latter's illness, absence from the capital on campaign, or in the interval between the dismissal of one Grand Vizier and the arrival to the capital of a new appointee. The practice began in the 16th century, or perhaps even earlier, and continued until the end of the Empire. The kaymakam enjoyed the full plenitude of powers of the Grand Vizier, but was not allowed to intervene in the conduct of the military campaigns. Selected from the ranks of the viziers, the kaymakam played an important role in the politics of the capital and often became involved in intrigues against the absent Grand Vizier, trying to replace him. In the last decades of the Empire, the post of kaymakam was filled by the members of the imperial cabinet, or by the Shaykh al-Islam.

The modernization and Westernization reforms instituted in the 19th century added new meanings to the term. With the establishment of the regular Asakir-i Mansure-i Muhammediye troops in 1826, kaymakam became a rank in the Ottoman army, equivalent to a lieutenant colonel. It remained in use throughout the final century of the Empire, and continued in use in the Turkish Republic until the 1930s, when it was replaced by the title of yarbay. The overhaul of the administrative system in the Tanzimat reforms soon after saw the use of kaymakam for the governor of a sanjak (second-level province), while after the establishment of the vilayet system in 1864, a kaymakam became the governor of a kaza (third-level province). The system was retained by modern Turkey, where a sub-province (ilçe after the 1920s) is still headed by a kaymakam.

=== Moldavian and Wallachian (Romanian) history ===
The term Caimacam has a specific meaning in Moldavian and Wallachian history, where it refers to a temporary replacement for a Domn (Hospodar/"Prince"), in and after Phanariote rule, as well as the delegates of the Oltenia Ban in Craiova after the main office was moved to Bucharest during the same period (1761).

In this context, the word may be spelled caimacam, while the Romanian term for the office is căimăcămie.

=== Persian Gulf history ===
==== Qatar history ====
In the Persian Gulf, four hakims (native rulers) of the later emirate of Qatar held the additional Ottoman title of kaymakam in their administrative capacity since 1872 of district administrator since the establishment of Ottoman sovereignty (as kaza [district] of Sandjak al-Hasa, within the vilayet of Baghdad, from 1875 Basra vilayet) till this was exchanged on 3 November 1916 with a British protectorate (as Sheikdom of Qatar, colonially under the chief political resident of the Persian Gulf, at Bahrein).

==== Kuwait history ====
Similarly, three ruling native hakims of the later emirate of Kuwait, were also Kaymakam of a kazas in the same province, 1871 till a British protectorate, also on 3 November 1914.

=== Egyptian history ===
In Ottoman Egypt, the title of kaymakam was used in its generic sense of "lieutenant" for deputies or agents, but most notably, until the ascendancy of Muhammad Ali of Egypt, for the interim governors of the country, who served between the removal of one governor and the installation of the next one. In the tumultuous politics of the ruling Mamluk elite, the appointment of a kaymakam "became, particularly in the 18th century, a device by which a Mamluk faction would legitimize its ascendancy" before installing one of its own members as governor. After Muhammad Ali consolidated his control of the country and his Westernizing reforms, the title, as in the rest of the Ottoman Empire, acquired a new technical meaning: in the army, it became a rank equivalent to lieutenant-colonel, while in the administration it signified the official in charge of a nahiye, with particular responsibility for the maintenance of the irrigation system.

== Kaymakams as a military rank ==
The rank is attested in use with a British officer commanding the Equatorial Battalion in East Africa, 1918: Kaimakam R F White DSO who was an officer of the Essex Regiment. In the 1947 Birthday Honours, a recipient of an MBE, Diran Bodossian, is referred to as "Assistant Paymaster Kaimakam" of the Trans-Jordan Frontier Force.

== See also ==
- Subdivisions of the Ottoman Empire
- Double Qaim-Maqamate of Mount Lebanon

== Sources ==
- WorldStatesMen.org, see present nations
