= Trams in Damascus =

Damascus tramway network (1907 to 1962)

Damascus tramway
- ترامواي دمشق
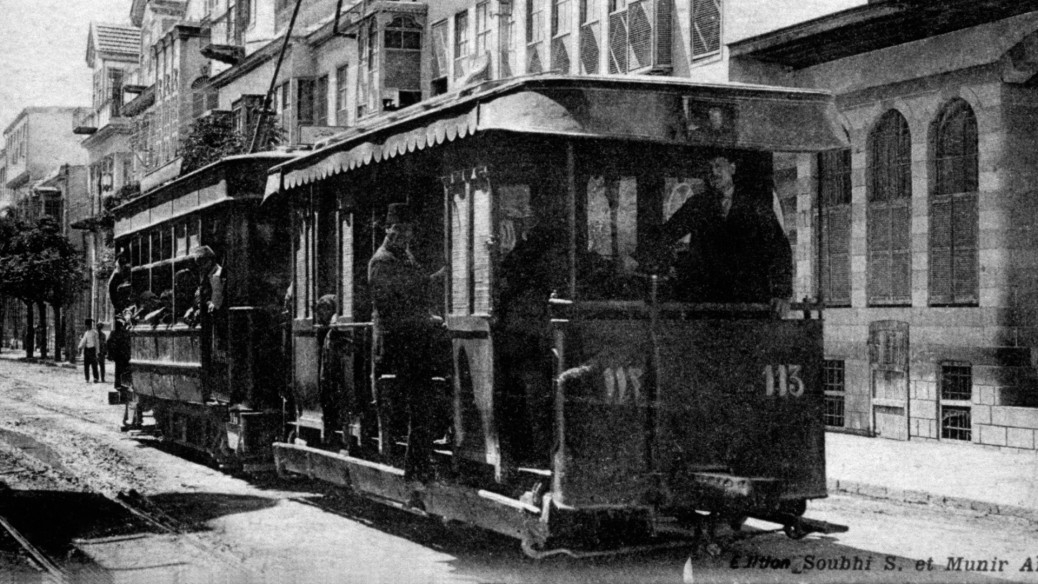
- Rear view of a Damascus tram, ca. 1910

Operation
- Locale: Damascus, Syria
- Open: 1907; 119 years ago
- Close: 1967; 59 years ago

Infrastructure
- Track gauge: 1,050 mm (3 ft 5 11/32 in)
- Propulsion system: Electric
- Electrification: 5,500 V AC overhead
Overview
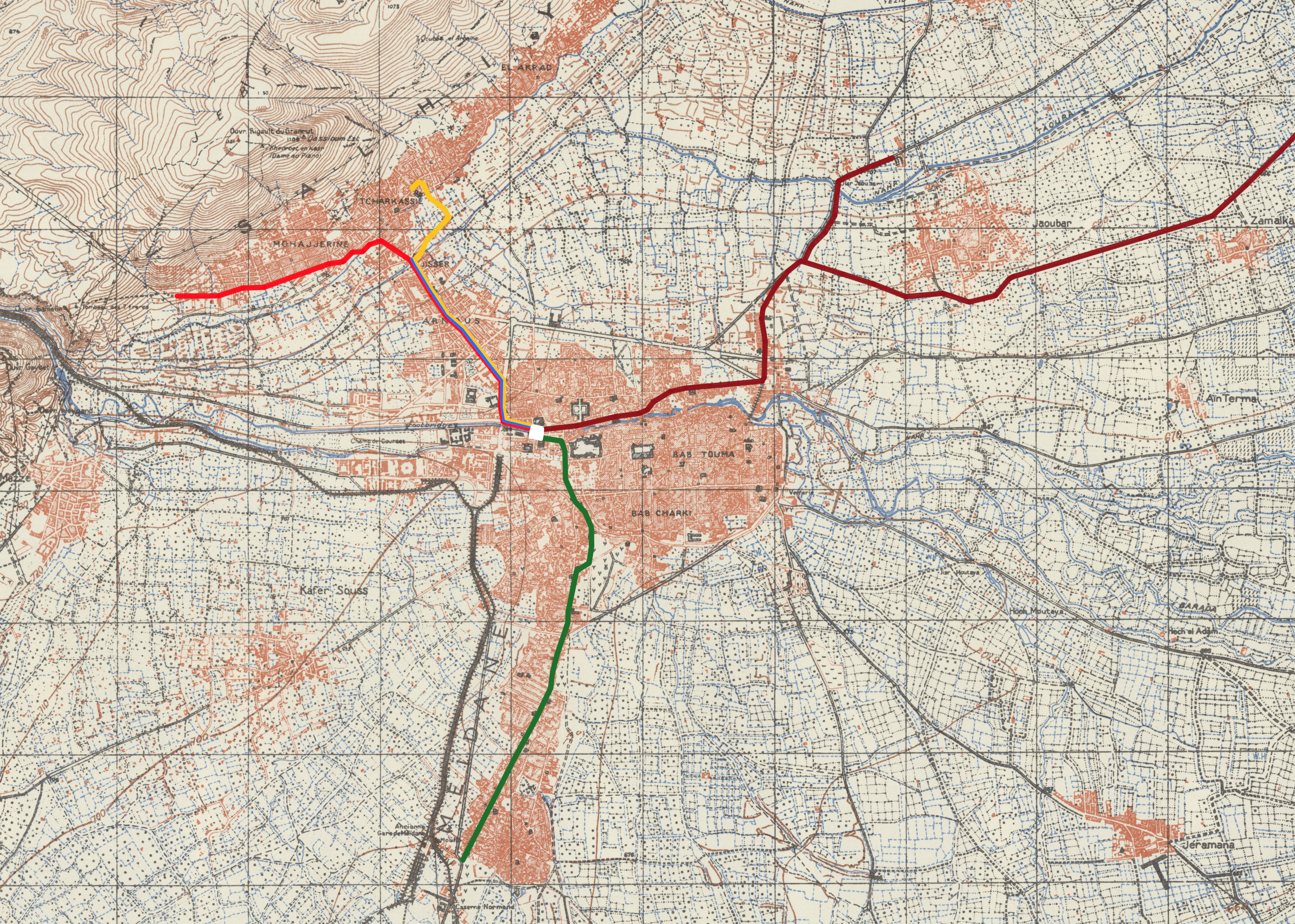

The Damascus tramway network served the city of Damascus, Syria from 1907 to 1962. It was the third city in the Arab world to be fitted with a tram network, behind Alexandria and Algiers. It was a radial network, with all routes originating from Marjeh Square.

== History ==
On October 21, 1887, Yusuf Matran submitted a request to obtain a concession for the construction of a tram network in Damascus that the Ottoman Ministry of Trade and Public Works received on November 10. Since Yusuf Matran had held the concession for the construction of the Port of Beirut, he was trusted to handle the project and was awarded a concession for the construction and operation of a horse-drawn tramway in 1889. The concession was designed on a build–operate–transfer model, where the contract itself was 99 years and there were stipulations allowing for a government buyout of the network after at least 30 years. The tramway was to have various radial routes branching from the centrally located Marjeh Square towards the municipalities of Al-Midan and Al-Salihiyah, as well as a line to Douma.

Matran's company (Beirut and Damascus Tramways Company) would inform the government that they wish to abandon the construction of a tramway in Damascus proper and the local administration agreed citing the large population of the city as well as its narrow and winding streets. However, the Imperial Ottoman administration denied the request to abandon the project and specified that the company would bear the responsibility of widening the streets to at least nine meters.

On July 30, 1903, the Ottoman government revoked Matran's concession and awarded Muhammed al-Arslan, an Ottoman-Lebanese subject, with a contract for establishing and operation a tramway, electricity, and lighting company in Damascus. Arslan needed to raise about six million francs to secure enough capital to begin construction. He sold each of his company's 12,000 shares at 500 francs each but failed to sell enough shares to begin construction as local wealthy investors were hesitant in investing in electricity. On December 5, 1904, the Belgium Imperial Ottoman Company for Tramways and Electric Lighting of Damascus (French: Société Impériale Ottoman de Tramway et d’éclairage Electrique de Damas, Arabic: الشركة العثمانية السلطانية للتنوير والجر والكهرباء بدمشق) brought a majority share in Arslan's company and became its primary owner.

By February 1907 the construction of two lines to Al-Midan and Al-Jisr Al-Abyad (a neighborhood in Al-Salihiyah) both starting at Marjeh Square had been completed, and trams began running along the two lines.

The Ottoman administration indefinitely suspended the operation of all of Damascus' tram services in 1917 during the Arab Revolt. Tram services were reinstated following the 1918 capture of Damascus by Arab and British troops.

=== Closure ===
The government began to phase out the network in 1962, removing tram lines and replacing them with diesel buses. The final trams ran in 1967.

== Operation ==
The tram network ran on narrow gauge tracks of 1050 mm, the same gauge as the Hejaz railway. Each tram carriage contained three sections, in the front was a first class cabin with leather seats which cost 7.5 Syrian piasters to ride in. The other two were sex-segregated sections, one for men and the other for women, which both featured wooden seats and cost 5 piasters to ride in. Students were eligible for a concessional fare of 2.5 piasters.

The trams on the network featured green and cream livery with the model number of the vehicle written in Eastern Arabic numerals. Unmotorized trailers cars ran exclusively on the route to Douma where they were pulled by a motorized carriage. The trams required up to 5,500 volts, and there were two types of breakage systems used on the network: air brakes and chain brakes. The air brakes were supplied by the Westinghouse Air Brake Company whereas some of the electrical equipment was supplied by Ganz Works.

=== Routes ===
By 1961, there were six routes in operation across the network. Route 5 (to Jobar) previously branched southward off from Al-Qassaa to reach Bab Tuma, however following the construction of a new depot in Jobar, the line was diverted to run northward from Al-Qassa to terminate near the depot. By March 1961, the track had been entirely rerouted but overhead lines remained across the redirected route.

All routes were entirely double-track, except for Route 5 and Route 6 (to Douma) which were double track until the site where the line to Bab Tuma branched from Al-Qassa. After Al-Qassa both routes ran on reserved single-track, however despite this trams took up to an hour to get to Douma due to delays caused by waiting at passing loops.

Route No.	Originating	Terminating	Notes
1	Marjeh Square	Al-Midan	
2	Marjeh Square	Al-Jisr Al-Abyad	
3	Marjeh Square	Sheikh Muhi ad-Din	Branches from Route 2 terminus
4	Marjeh Square	Muhajreen	Branches from Route 2 terminus
5	Marjeh Square	Jobar	Splits off from Route 6
6	Marjeh Square	Douma	Splits off from Route 5.
