= Timeline of the Syrian civil war (August–December 2015) =

The following is a timeline of the Syrian Civil War from August to December 2015. Information about aggregated casualty counts is found at Casualties of the Syrian Civil War.

== August 2015 ==
=== 11 August ===
Rebels begin their push into the Alawite heartland by capturing much of the Sahl al-Ghab plain in northwestern Syria.

=== 16 August ===
According to the Syrian Observatory for Human Rights, four separate missiles were fired at Douma by SAAF fighters, which struck the main market in the town during rush hour, killing 96 people.

=== 22 August ===
At least 50 people - mainly women and children - are killed when the Assad regime targeted the Douma town in an opposition-held suburb of Damascus with barrel bombs. A number of buildings were destroyed by the attacks, while another 100 are injured.

=== 30 August ===
ISIS fighters launch an assault on Qadam and Asali in the southern outskirts of Damascus from their base in Al-Hajar al-Aswad, clashing with Jaysh al-Islam fighters in Qadam and those of Ajnad al-Sham in Asali.

== September 2015 ==
=== 1 September ===
Levant Front clandestine security conducted an undercover raid into an area under ISIS control in the northern Aleppo countryside, killing three foreign fighters of ISIS.

=== 2 September ===
Digital reports surface on the web of a possible Russian Air Force bombing campaign in Syria, mostly targeting ISIS & other Islamist objectives.

=== 4 September ===
Fierce clashes took place in the vicinity of Marea town north of Aleppo, where Levant Front rebel soldiers killed seven ISIS militants and took 11 others as hostages, beside destroying three ISIS vehicles. The Shamiya Front also seized heavy machine guns from ISIS militants, as dozens withdrew from the area after "heavy losses".

Other rebel factions attacked ISIS-held villages of Harbal, Sandaf, Kafrah and Harjal in the northern countryside of Aleppo. It was not clear whether the attacks caused any casualties in the ranks of ISIS.

=== 5 September ===
Anti-government violence erupted in the town of Sweida, a stronghold of the Druze minority sect, following the killing of Druze leader Sheikh Wahid Al-Balous, a prominent cleric in rare explosions the previous day that claimed the lives of at least 25 others. Rioters holding the government responsible for the cleric's death destroyed the statue of late President Hafez al-Assad and besieged security offices.

=== 6 September ===
Israeli Prime Minister Benjamin Netanyahu rejects notion of accepting Syrian refugees.

=== 11 September ===
A Syrian military source informs of Russian troops presence in Syria.

Jaysh al-Islam shelled and stormed Adra Prison, taking control of two buildings.

=== 15 September ===
The Levant Front shoots down an M6 warplane for the pro-Assad air force near the Nairab military airport in Aleppo province, and seizes control of major parts of Hamdaniyah district after fierce clashes with pro-Assad militias, killing at least fifteen regime soldiers. The Front also bombs pro-Assad security headquarters in Salahaddin neighborhood. The regime forces responded with dropping more than six barrel bombs on the rebel-held neighborhoods of Dahiya and Shekhan in Aleppo, killing more than ten civilians.

=== 16 September ===
At least 15 civilians - six children and nine women - are killed and dozens injured after pro-Assad warplanes launch some four rockets targeting residential buildings in rebel-held al-Maadi neighborhood in Aleppo city in the evening, with more than 25 injured.

=== 17 September ===
A short video is released purporting to show Free Syria Army (FSA) soldiers in Idlib installing sensor wires on a new DIY missile defense system for areas under their control to provide some protection to the civilians and planning to continue the project in other cities.

Government helicopters drop barrel bombs that struck a busy market place, that is packed with shoppers and people buying necessities for children who go back to school this week, in the FSA-held Bosra, killing between 17 and 24 people and many others wounded, with many of them in critical condition.

At least 47 people were killed in air raids by Syrian government forces in rebel-held areas of the northern city of Aleppo.

Syrian warplanes carried out a wave of airstrikes in the Islamic State-held city of Raqqa.

=== 18 September ===
United States Defense Secretary Ashton B. Carter opened a dialogue regarding Syria with his Russian counterpart, Sergei K. Shoigu, aimed at making sure that American and Russian forces avoid running into each other.

The Islam Army posts a video showing its members firing multiple rockets at the Latakia International Airport on the coast used by Russian troops, and warns the Russians that they will not enjoy peace in Syria.

=== 21 September ===
Pro-Assad forces targeted al-Shaar neighborhood in eastern Aleppo city with surface-to-surface missiles, hitting a crowded public market, killing more than 30 civilians and dozens wounded.

=== 22 September ===
Syrian army recaptures villages in Hama suburbs.

=== 24 September ===
More than 2 months after the siege began, the UN announced that an agreement between the warring parties had finally been reached after repeated mediation efforts. Per the agreement, the remaining entrenched rebels were able to withdraw from Syrian government besieged Al-Zabadani and lease control of the town to the Syrian government while surrendering all weapons, save for light handguns, and withdrawing to the Idlib Province. Conversely, civilians (approximately 10,000 people) still remaining inside the rebel-besieged Shi'ite villages of Al-Fu'ah and Kafriya are to be evacuated. Evacuation of wounded from both sides was expected to begin as early as 25 September. An additional stipulation denotes the release of 500 rebel captives from Syrian government-held prisons. The agreement would be overseen by the United Nations office in Damascus. However, SOHR reported on 26 September that a rebel fighter had been killed in a firefight with the NDF near the villages of Al-Fou’aa and Kafraya.

Two days later the first bus transport evacuating the rebel combatants to Idlib began leaving Al-Zabadani.

The ceasefire was still in effect despite a couple of violations on 27 September.

=== 26 September ===
The U.S. military admitted that US-trained Syrian rebels has handed over their vehicles and ammunition to fighters linked to al-Qaeda, apparently to gain safe passage.

=== 27 September ===
Its reported that the British Prime Minister David Cameron did not rule out that Assad could be part of a transition, but "what he is very clear about is that Assad cannot be part of Syria's future in the long run."

France starts launching its first air strikes in Syria targeting ISIS training camps.

Russian President Vladimir Putin branded U.S. support for rebel forces in Syria as illegal under the UN charter and ineffective, saying U.S.-trained rebels were leaving to join Islamic State with weapons supplied by Washington, according to the American military's own reports.

=== 29 September ===
Digital Reports informs that the Pentagon has suspended the "train and equip" program for Syrian Rebels also known as New Syrian Forces (NSF).

=== 30 September ===
Russia starts bombing Syria.

== October 2015 ==
=== 4 October ===
Egyptian President Abdel Fattah el-Sisi expressed its support to the Russian military intervention in the Syrian Civil War.

=== 7 October ===
4th Hama Offensive begins with Iranian and Russian support.

The FSA repels an offensive mounted by Assad forces in the countryside near Hama, destroying 10 government tanks – despite coming under repeated Russian air assault.

=== 8 October ===
FSA rebels claim to have downed two regime helicopters that were mounting a coordinated air assault with Russian warplanes on the village of al-Mugheer. Meanwhile, the Syrian Army captures 40 km of territory in northern Hama

=== 10 October ===
On 10 October, it was reported that the Syrian Army captured the strategically important villages of Atshan and Om Hartein and that it was pushing onwards to capture Khan Shaykhun in southern Idlib province. A number of government tanks and APC's were destroyed during the clashes. Hezbollah senior leader Hassan Hussein al-Haj was killed that day.

=== 14 October ===
A U.S. official told Fox News that Russian Airstrikes have killed 150 CIA trained rebels in "deliberately targeting" during its Intervention in Syria.

=== 20 October ===
Military officials of Russia and the U.S. signed a "memorandum of understanding" to avoid clashes in air over Syria.

The new elected Prime Minister of Canada, Justin Trudeau announced that his nation will no longer provide jets fighters for the fight against ISIS.

Former U.S. President Jimmy Carter announced that he provided maps of ISIS positions in Syria to the Russian embassy in Washington.

Russian warplanes struck a field hospital in the town of Sarmin killing 13 people, including two medical staff. A physiotherapist, Hassan Taj al-Din, and a hospital guard from the clinic, which was run by the Syrian-American Medical Society (SAMS), were killed in the attack. Taj al-Din leaves behind his four-months pregnant wife.

=== 28 October ===
Regime forces conducted airstrikes that dropped as many as 12 barrel bombs on the town of Darayya in multiple raids, killing at least three people including a woman and her son.

=== 29 October ===
The Syrian Observatory of Human Rights reported that according to a defected ISIS leading figure from Syrian descent, over 200 ISIS fighters from Chechnya and central Asian nationalities were executed for trying to defect from IS to join Jabhat al-Nusra.

=== 31 October ===
IS captures Mheen and Hawwarin, west of Al-Qaryateyn city.

== November 2015 ==
=== 2 November ===
Jaysh al-Islam a major rebel group near the capital Damascus, displayed caged civilian captives used as 'human shields'.

=== 5 November ===
Jund al-Aqsa-led rebel forces seized control of Murak, following clashes with pro-government forces.

=== 6 November ===
The Ajnad al-Sham showed pictures of a beheaded SAA officer, labeling him as a "Nusayri" (derogatory word to an Alawi Muslim) on Twitter and Facebooks accounts. In a separate event, the Ajnad al-Sham and other rebel forces recaptured the village of Atshan and surrounding areas in Hama province, consolidating significant advances made the day before at the expense of pro-government forces.

=== 8 November ===
Russian air strikes on areas in the town of Maaret al-Numan, Idlib, killing nine people, including a child, and on Saraqib in the same province, killing another two women.

At least 10 people were killed in Syrian government air strikes on ISIS-held town of Al-Bab, including a woman and child.

=== 10 November ===
Syrian Armed Forces reach the Kwayres Airbase and end the siege of 3 years imposed by ISIS.

Syrian Rebels fire a rocket at Latakia killing 22 civilians and wounding 65.

=== 11 November ===
Eastern media reports of massive desertions in the Free Syria Army (FSA) forces located in Aleppo, fueled mostly by lack of payment.

=== 13 November ===
Army media reported SAA advances into the Marj Al-Sultan Military Airbase in Damascus, after heavy clashes with Jaysh al-Islam, meanwhile in Aleppo the Lebanese Group Hezbollah and Syrian Army Units reported the capture of Jabal Al-Eiss from Harakat Ahrar Al-Sham rebels.

=== 14 November ===
Government forces and its allies capture 408 Square Kilometers of Territory in Southern Aleppo, this marks the largest series of gains for the pro-government forces since their first offensive at the Qalamoun Mountains in late 2013.

=== 17 November ===
Syrian state media reported that the SAA seized the village of al-Hadath from the Islamic State around 30 km from the Damascus-Homs highway On the same day, Russian Long Range Aviation commences its airstrikes against ISIL in Syria.

=== 19 November ===
Government forces shelling in Sheikh Maskin, Daraa and Douma killed 20 people and wounded 90.

=== 23 November ===
Syrian armed forces reported advances through Homs Governorate at Mahaden, Northern Latakia and strides towards the Aleppo-Lattakia highway.

=== 24 November ===
Turkish F-16s shoot down a Russian Su-24 operating in Northern Latakia. Both occupants ejected successfully. The pilot was shot and killed by Syrian Turkmen rebel ground fire while descending by parachute. The weapon systems officer was rescued two days later. A Russian naval infantryman from the search-and-rescue team launched to retrieve the two airmen was also killed when a rescue helicopter was shot down by the rebels.

=== 28 November ===
A regime helicopter dropped barrel bomb on a populated area of Zafaraneh town near the city of Homs, killing a man and a young girl and wounding 16 other people. Soon after the patients were all admitted to the MSF-supported Al-Zafarana hospital, three more barrel bombs landed nearby, killing one bystander and wounding 31 patients under treatment and medical staff. Parts of the hospital were destroyed and the kidney dialysis unit was heavily damaged. The most critically wounded patients were transferred to three nearby hospitals. Five of them died en route. In total, seven people died and 47 were wounded, including 23 women and children under the age of 15.

=== 29 November ===
94 wanted persons from Damascus, its countryside and Idleb provinces turned themselves in to authorities in order to have their legal status settled.

Russian airstrikes kill at least 18 civilians and wound dozens more in the town of Ariha.

== December 2015 ==
=== 1 December ===
Israeli Prime Minister Benjamin Netanyahu admitted for the first time in public that Israeli forces had carried out operations in Syria to prevent the transfer of weapons to Lebanon.

=== 3 December ===
Russian announced its intentions to open a second airbase in Homs.

United Kingdom fighters restart bombing operations in Syria against Islamic State militants.

=== 4 December ===
Germany's parliament approved government plans to join the military campaign against Islamic State in Syria but that German airstrikes would operate independently that those of France, Britain, United States and Russia.

=== 5 December ===
Government Forces seized 60 km of land in the province of Latakia from FSA and other rebel forces, according to pro-government media.

=== 10 December ===
One of the largest rebel groups operating in Syria, Ahrar ash-Sham withdrew from the Saudi-brokered Riyadh conference aimed at uniting opposition fighters.

=== 13 December ===
Western media reports of low morale, desertions, and distrust of leaders by the Free Syria Army (FSA) fighters. Claiming that the FSA is on the verge of collapse, for a number of reasons. Including lack of payments and failure to achieve any significant victories or create any "liberated" zones.

The Syrian government air force launched a deadly airstrike on the rebel-held city of Douma in the suburb of Damascus, killing more than 40 civilians and wounding 75 others. The airstrike hit a building where a large number of civil rights activists and residents of Douma were gathered to discuss the humanitarian crisis in the city. There was no single armed person in the targeted building. All casualties are civilians.

=== 17 December ===
Eight people, including four children, were killed and another 11 were injured after Russian warplanes struck a residential area in Aleppo's Azaz district.

=== 18 December ===
Russian warplanes carried out airstrikes on residential buildings in rebel-held town of Jisr al-Shughour, killing between 14 and 17 people, included women and children.

=== 20 December ===
At least six to nine Russian airstrikes hit a busy market place in the center of the rebel-held Idlib city, several government buildings and residential areas, killing 43 civilians and insurgents and wounding over 150. The attacks coincided with the release of a report by Human Rights Watch that accuse Russia and the Syrian government of using cluster bombs — indiscriminate, scattershot munitions — that killed dozens of civilians in Syria in the previous weeks.

=== 24 December ===
Government fighter jets launched several raids on the opposition-held district of Hammuriyah in southeastern Damascus, causing damage to residential buildings and shops in central Hammuriyah in the Eastern Ghouta. At least 17 civilians were killed and 25 others injured.

=== 26 December ===
A series of Rebel leaders are targeted across Syria, a Russian airstrike, coordinated with Syrian government intelligence, hit a building in Damascus suburb where leading members of the Army of Islam group were meeting. The top leader and founder of Jaish al-Islam Zahran Alloush was among 4 leaders killed in the airstrike including its deputy. Zahran Alloush was the founder of Jaysh al-Islam, the largest opposition group in Rif-Damashq province. He deserted from the Free Syrian Army (FSA) and established another rebel group. Essam al-Buwaydhani replaces Zahran Alloush as head of Jaysh al-Islam.

The Syrian Democratic Forces (SDF) leadership confirms that more than 200 rebels deserted the Raqqa Revolutionary Brigade and joined SDF ranks over the past few days. In a separate event, the SDF seizes the Tishreen Dam, a main supply route for ISIS militants between Raqqa and Aleppo.

=== 28 December ===
Buses and ambulances head to Zabadani to evacuate 126 civilians and wounded fighters from the besieged rebel bastion. The evacuation is part of a truce in which rebels and civilians are taken from the besieged town and transported to Beirut, in turn 336 Shi'ite villagers from Kefraya and Fuaa are allowed to head to Turkey with the aim of reaching Lebanon.
