= Masjid Aqsab =

Masjid Aqsab مسجد الأقصاب
- Neighborhood
- Location in Syria
- Coordinates: 33°31′5″N 36°18′41″E
- Country: Syria
- Governorate: Damascus Governorate
- Subdistrict: Damascus
- Municipality: Sarouja

Population (2004)
  - Total: 14,148

Masjid Aqsab (Arabic: مسجد الأقصاب), also called Masjid al-Qasab, is a neighborhood and district of the Sarouja municipality of Damascus, Syria. It had a population of 14,148 in the 2004 census. The neighborhood was founded during the Mamluk era (14th century) as a suburb of the walled city of Damascus, bordering the Bab al-Salam gate to the south and contiguous with the al-Faradis neighborhood to the west. It was built around the Aqsab Mosque, after which the neighborhood was named. The mosque purportedly contained the graves of seven Sahaba (companions of Muhammad). In the 1936 French Mandate census, the neighborhood had a population of 6,900, all Muslims.
