= Küçük Ahmed Pasha =

Beylerbey of Damascus
- In office 1632–1635
- Monarch: Murad IV (r. 1623–1640)
- Preceded by: Unavailable

Beylerbey of Anatolia
- In office Unavailable–1632
- Monarch: Murad IV

Beylerbey of Damascus
- In office 1628/29 or 1629/30 – Unavailable
- Monarch: Murad IV

Personal details
- Born: Albania
- Died: 21 September 1636 Mosul
- Military career
- Burial place: Al-Asali Tekkiye, Damascus
- Allegiance: Ottoman Empire
- Rank: Vizier
- Conflicts: Suppression of Revolt of Ilyas Pasha (1630); Suppression of Fakhr al-Din II (1633); Sack of Tabriz (1635); Battle of Mosul (1636)

Küçük Ahmed Pasha (Albanian: Kyçyk Ahmed Pasha; died 21 September 1636) was an Ottoman military commander who twice served as beylerbey (governor-general) of Damascus, one term as beylerbey of Anatolia and died commanding troops against Safavid Iran. By eliminating the rebel Ilyas Pasha in Anatolia and the powerful Druze chief Fakhr al-Din in Mount Lebanon and his command role against the Safavids, Ahmed Pasha played an important part in the Ottoman imperial revival under Sultan Murad IV (r. 1623–1640).

== Early career ==
Ahmed Pasha was an ethnic Albanian and was nicknamed Küçük (the Small). He began his career as a sipahi (regular cavalryman) before becoming a commander of Turkmen cavalries. He was appointed the beylerbey (governor-general) of Damascus Eyalet in 1628/29 or 1629/30. He was then transferred to the governorship of Anatolia, remaining in that office until 1632. During his term there he suppressed the revolt of Ilyas Pasha, who had taken control of the western Anatolian town of Magnesia and whom Ahmed Pasha had captured and brought to Constantinople to be executed.

== Second governorship of Damascus ==
For his success against Ilyas Pasha, he was promoted to the rank of vizier and appointed back to Damascus in 1632 to eliminate Fakhr al-Din II, a Druze chief and sanjak-bey (district governor). The latter had gained practical control over an area extending from Safed to Latakia, controlled thirty fortresses, and maintained a large army of outlawed sekban mercenaries, all in defiance of the Ottomans. There were additional governmental fears that he was poised to take over Damascus city. Ahmed Pasha defeated Fakhr al-Din's forces and besieged him in a cave in southern Mount Lebanon in 1633. He forced him to surrender by lighting fires around the cave, causing Fakhr al-Din and his men to choke from the smoke. He escorted the Druze leader through Damascus, where the city's residents congratulated Ahmed Pasha and local poets sang his praises. He then sent Fakhr al-Din to Constantinople, where he was executed two years later.

Following his capture of Fakhr al-Din, Ahmed Pasha confiscated the properties of the Druze chief and his family, the Ma'n dynasty. He had his properties in Tyre and al-Jazira near Baalbek endowed for his own tekkiye (Sufi lodge) in the town of al-Qadam, called al-Asali, and the Umayyad Mosque in Damascus. His tekkiye was founded in 1635 as a lodge for the well-known local Sufi shaykh of the Khalwati order, al-Asali, after whom the tekkiye is commonly known. It was one of the few monuments to be built in greater Damascus in the early 17th century. It was often used to distribute food to the Muslim pilgrims on their way to the Hajj to Mecca. The entirety of Fakhr al-Din's assets, including dozens of properties in Sidon, meanwhile, became part of Ahmed Pasha's waqf (religious endowment) in 1634 or 1636 as a reward by Sultan Murad IV for his success and again posthumously in 1637; the pasha endowed the properties for the benefit of the Muslim holy cities of Mecca and Medina.

== Commander on the Iranian front ==
Ahmed Pasha was reassigned as a commander of the imperial vanguard in the war with Safavid Iran, playing a distinguishing role in the sack of Tabriz in 1635. Murad appointed him to lead the defense of Mosul from Safavid attack. There he died "a glorious death" fighting Safavid forces on 21 September 1636, according to the historian A. Abdel Nour. He was buried in his tekkiye in Qadam. For his efforts against rebels in Anatolia, Fakhr al-Din in Syria and the Safavids, Abdel Nour noted that Ahmed Pasha played "a prominent part in the revival of the Ottoman Empire under Murad IV".

== Bibliography ==
- Abdel Nour, A. (2004). "Aḥmad Pasha Küçük". In Bearman, P. J.; Bianquis, Th.; Bosworth, C. E.; van Donzel, E. & Heinrichs, W. P. (eds.). The Encyclopaedia of Islam, Second Edition. Volume XII: Supplement. Leiden: E. J. Brill. p. 49. ISBN 978-90-04-13974-9.
- Abu-Husayn, Abdul-Rahim (1985). Provincial Leaderships in Syria, 1575–1650. Beirut: American University of Beirut. ISBN 9780815660729.
- Barbir, Karl K. (1980). Ottoman Rule in Damascus, 1708–1758. Princeton: Princeton University Press. ISBN 9781400853205.
- Meier, Astrid (2007). "For the Sake of God Alone? Food Distribution Policies, Takiyyas and Imarets in Early Ottoman Damascus". In Ergin, Nina; Neumann, Christoph; Singer, Amy (eds.). Feeding People, Feeding Power: Imarets in the Ottoman Empire. Istanbul: Eren. pp. 121–149. ISBN 9789756372395.
- Weber, Stefan (2010). "The Making of an Ottoman Harbour Town: Sidon/Saida from the Sixteenth to the Eighteenth Centuries". In Sluglett, Peter; Weber, Stefan (eds.). Syria and Bilad al-Sham under Ottoman rule: Essays in Honour of Abdul-Karim Rafeq. Leiden and Boston: Brill. pp. 179–240. ISBN 978-90-04-18193-9.
