= Aqsab Mosque =

Mosque in Damascus, Syria

- جَامِع القَصَب
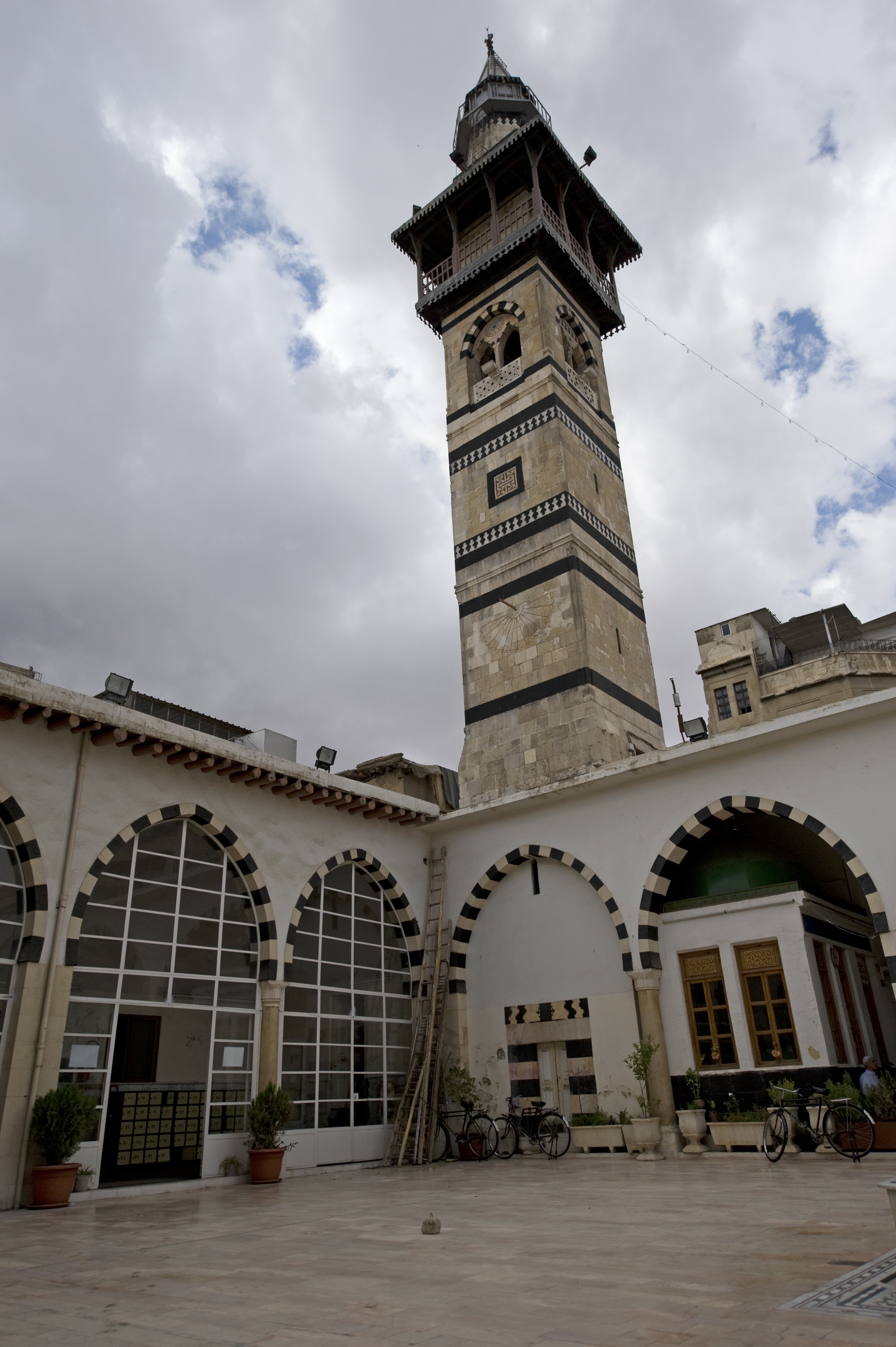

- Location of the mosque in Damascus

Religion
- Affiliation: Sunni Islam
- Ecclesiastical or organisational status: Mosque and mausoleum
- Status: Active

Location
- Location: Sarouja, Damascus
- Country: Syria
- Interactive map of Aqsab Mosque
- Coordinates: 33°31′05″N 36°18′40″E

Architecture
- Type: Mosque
- Style: Ayyubid
- Completed: 1234 CE

Specifications
- Minaret: 1
- Shrines: 1: (Aqsab al-Sadat, or the seven Companions of the Prophet Mohammed)
- Materials: Limestone, basalt, metal, timber, plywood, porphyry, and marble

The Aqsab Mosque or Al-Aqsab Mosque (Arabic: جَامِع الْأَقْصَاب, romanized: Jāmiʿ al-ʾAqṣāb, lit. 'Mosque of the Sugarcanes') or Al-Qasab Mosque (Arabic: جَامِع القصب, romanized: Jāmiʿ al-qaṣab), also known as Al-Sadat Mosque (Arabic: جَامِع السادات, romanized: Jāmiʿ al-Sādāt), is an Ayyubid-era Sunni mosque and mausoleum in Damascus, Syria. The mosque is located on Suq Sarujiyya, outside the walls of the old city, near the Bab al-Salam gate.

The mosque houses a tomb dedicated to Aqsab al-Sadat, or the seven Companions of the Prophet Mohammed, as indicated by an inscription above the mausoleum door.

== Gallery ==
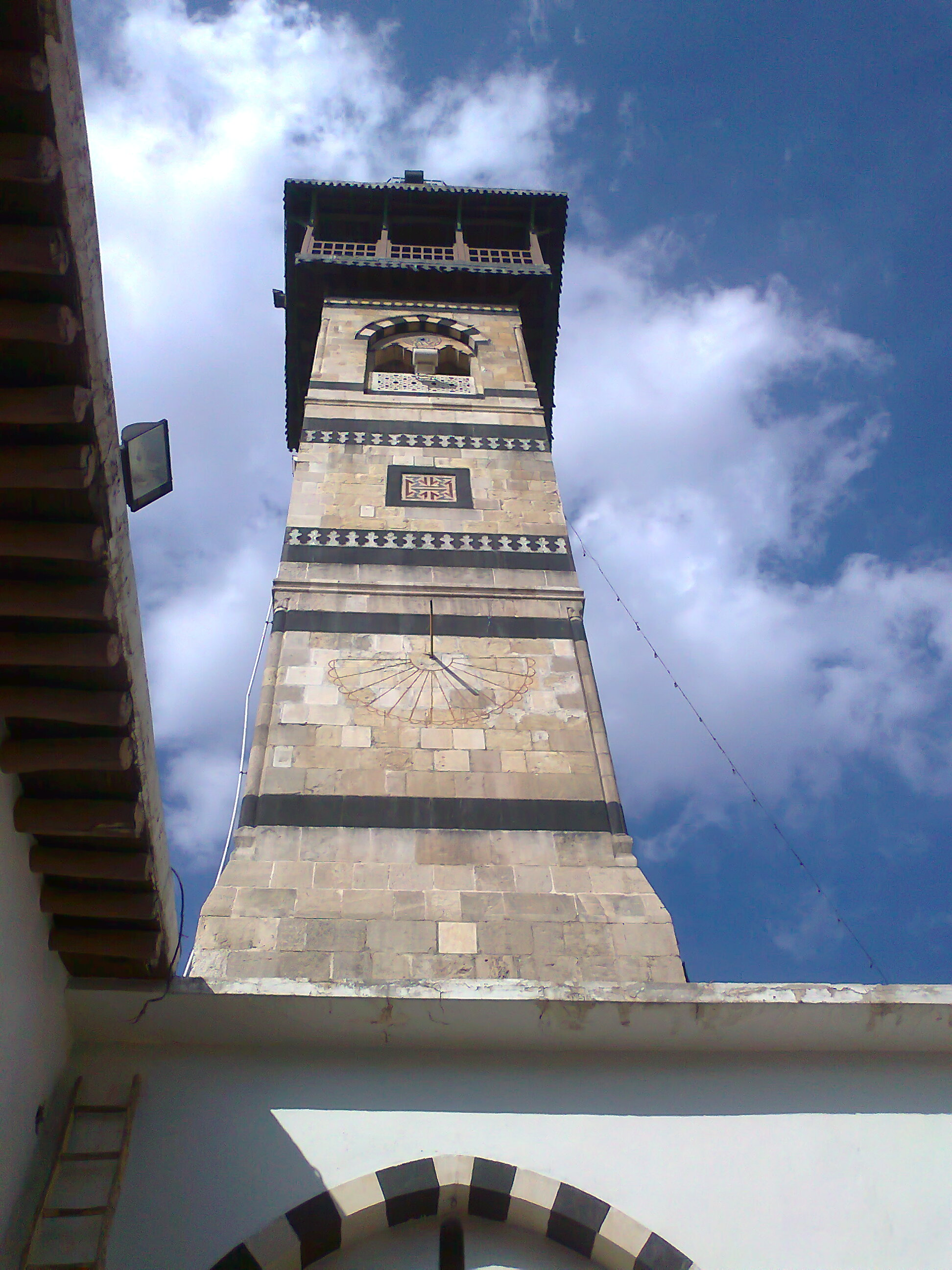
Minaret

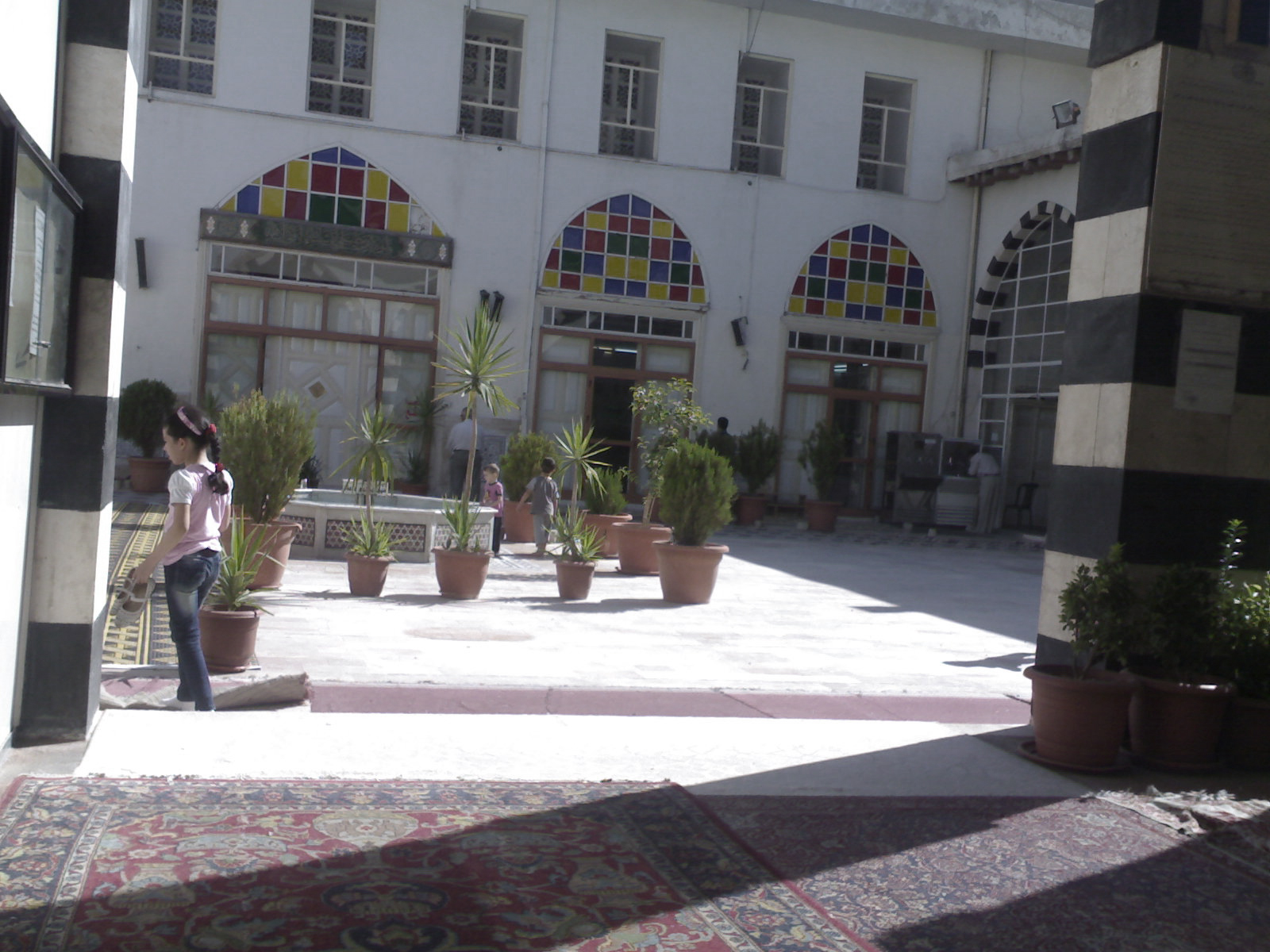
Mosque's courtyard

== See also ==
- Sunni Islam in Syria
- List of mosques in Syria
