= Municipalities of Damascus =

- Municipalities of Damascus
- Country: Syria
- Governorate: Damascus Governorate
- City: Damascus
- City municipalities: 16
- City districts: 95

Area
  - City: 105 km^{2} (41 sq mi)
  - Urban: 77 km^{2} (30 sq mi)
- Elevation: 680 m (2,230 ft)

Population (2022 estimate)
  - City: 2,503,000
  - Density: 23,800/km^{2} (61,700/sq mi)

Administratively, Damascus Governorate, one of Syria's 14 governorates, is divided into 16 municipalities (Arabic: بلدية, romanized: baladiyah). Every municipal district is managed by an elected mayor, which in turn is divided into 95 districts (Arabic: الحي hayy), each headed by a mayor, and they all participate in the election of the Damascus city council. Yarmouk is one whole municipality, and is divided into six neighborhoods.

== Municipalities of Damascus Governorate ==
Municipality	Population (2004)	Districts
Ancient City (Old City)	24,721	Amarah Juwaniyyah (pop. 2,451); Al-Amin (pop. 3,220); Bab Tuma (pop. 5,746); Al-Hamidiyya (pop. 208); Al-Hariqa (pop. 266); Jura (pop. 2,583); Ma'azanat ash-Shahm (pop. 3,707); Qaymariyya (pop. 4,034); Shaghour al-Juwani (pop. 2,506)
Barzeh	107,596	Al-Abbas (pop. 23,112); Barza al-Balad (pop. 31,634); Ish al-Warwar (pop. 20,458); Al-Manara (pop. 10,199); Masakin Barzeh (pop. 15,705); An-Nuzha (pop. 6,488)
Dummar	96,962	Al-Arin (pop. 14,285); Dahiyet Dummar (pop. 18,739); Dummar al-Gharbiyah (pop. 30,031); Dummar al-Sharqiyah (pop. 19,739); Al-Wuroud (pop. 14,167)
Jobar	83,245	Jobar Gharbi (pop. 17,799); Jobar Sharqi (pop. 42,430); Al-Istiqlal (pop. 1,677); Al-Ma'muniyah (pop. 21,339)
Qanawat	58,053	Ansari (pop. 9,552); Bab al-Jabiyah (pop. 3,697); Bab Sreijeh (pop. 5,612); Baramkeh (pop. 14,969); Al-Hijaz (pop. 5,572); Mujtahid (pop. 3,061); Qanawat (pop. 4,610); Qabr Atikah (pop. 7,213); Al-Suwayqah (pop. 3,767)
Kafr Souseh	113,968	Fardos (pop. 34,861); Al-Ikhlas (pop. 23,134); Kafr Souseh al-Balad (pop. 21,983); Al-Liwan (pop. 20,109); Mezzeh al-Basatin (pop. 3,606); Al-Waha (pop. 10,275)
Mezzeh	123,313	Al-Jalaa (pop. 3,514); Fe'alat al-Gharbiyah (pop. 12,393); Fe'alat al-Sharqiyah (pop. 13,776); Mezzeh 86 (pop. 33,191); Mezzeh al-Qadimeh (pop. 13,555); Mezzeh Jabal (pop. 22,655); Al-Rabwa (pop. 10,002); Al-Sumariyah (pop. 14,227)
Al-Midan	177,456	Bab Masr (pop. 11,330); Daqaq (pop. 10,858); Al-Haqleh (pop. 8,076); Al-Qa'a (pop. 11,791); Midan al-Wastani (pop. 23,745); Naher Aisha (pop. 20,805); Al-Tadamon (pop. 86,793); Az-Zahreh (pop. 24,863)
Muhajreen	55,510	Abu Rummaneh (pop. 6,421); A-Haboubi (pop. 5,453); Al-Maliki (pop. 4,035); Al-Marabit (pop. 6,474); Al-Mastaba (pop. 9,620); Al-Rawda (pop. 5,671); Shura (pop. 17,836)
Qaboun	89,974	Al-Masaneh' (pop. 3,419); Qaboun (pop. 33,327); Tishrin (pop. 53,228); Abu Jarash
Qadam	95,944	Al-Asali (pop. 21,731); Dahadil (pop. 14,310); Jouret al-Shreibati (8,836); Al-Mustafa (pop. 9,218); Al-Qadam (pop. 18,649); Qadam Sharqi (pop. 4,022); Al-Sayyidah Aisha (pop. 19,178)
Rukn ad-Din	92,646	Asad ad-Din (pop. 34,314); Ayyubiyah (pop. 13,089); Al-Fayhaa (pop. 11,330); Al-Naqshabandi (pop. 33,913)
Al-Salihiyah	72,303	Abu Jarash (pop. 12,798); Al-Madaris (pop. 12,731); Al-Mazra'a (pop. 6,818); Qasyoun (pop. 22,017); Shaykh Muhyi ad-Din (pop. 11,502); Ash-Shuhada (pop. 6,437)
Sarouja	83,814	Al-Adwi (pop. 16,088); Amarah al-Barraniyah (pop. 2,159); Fares al-Khoury (pop. 8,970); Masjid Aqsab (pop. 14,148); Al-Qassaa (pop. 11,467); Al-Qusour (pop. 15,568); Al-Uqaybah (pop. 8,813); Sarouja (pop. 6,601)
Al-Shaghour	119,569	Bab Sharqi (pop. 12,318); Al-Bilal (pop. 21,408); Ibn Asakir (pop. 4,539); Al-Nidal (15,588); Rawdat al-Midan (pop. 4,887); Shaghour al-Barrani (pop. 13,169); Al-Wihdeh (pop. 29,553); Az-Zuhur (pop. 37,367)
Yarmouk	137,248	Al-Faluja (pop. 11,245); Hittin (pop. 47,922); Al-Karmil (pop. 19,420); An-Naseriyah (pop. 17,272); March 8 (pop. 5,858); Al-Taqqadum (pop. 35,531)

== See also ==
- Districts of Syria
- Governorates of Syria
