= History of the Imam Reza Shrine =

One of the shrines of Shia Imam in Iran

The history of the Imam Reza Shrine, located in Mashhad, Iran, is centered on the only tomb of Shi'ite imams in Iran. It was the most important religious shrine of the Safavid era. With the establishment of the Safavid dynasty, Shi'ism was declared the official religion of Iran. In implementing this purpose, the Safavid shahs developed the holy places as a place for the Shia people by expanding the culture of endowment and creating endowments. The Safavid shahs tried to expand it in various ways, including allocating government budgets and endowments and giving ornaments and charity. One of the significant results of their performance was the increase in endowments of the Imam Reza shrine, which continued in the direction of creating a center for the spread of Shia culture, its prosperity, and continuity.

== Courtyards ==
The Islamic Revolution courtyard

The Revolution courtyard is the oldest sahn of the Razavi Haram, also known as "antique" and "Saqaqhana." The construction of this new courtyard, which was later named Azadi courtyard, was started by order of Fath-Ali Shah Qajar. With the cooperation of his son Alinqi Mirza with the architect Haj Agha Jan (the owner of the famous Haj Agha Jan Bazaar in Mashhad). Its building was built during the reign of Naser al-Din Shah Qajar.

Gohar Shad courtyard

Courtyard Goharshad is one of the old sahns of Imam Reza's shrine. Gohar Shad courtyard leads from the north side to the corridor leading to the grave of Ali bin Musa al-Reza and from the south side to the porch of the Goharshad Mosque. The eastern part of the Sahnehis located next to Imam Khomeini's entrance, and the western part is located next to the extension of Sheikh Baha'i.

Islamic Republic courtyard

The infrastructure of this sahn, including its basement, is 19,065 square metres (205,210 sq ft), the open space of the court is about 7,302 square metres (78,600 sq ft), and the court stands is approximately 4,622 square metres (49,750 sq ft). On the sides of this courtyard, four porches are built in the style of traditional Islamic architecture.

Quds courtyard

In the 1960s, the construction of a sahn called "Quds" was placed on the agenda of Astan Quds, and its physical structure was completed in 1370 and 1373, and tiling and decoration work was completed.

Hedayat courtyard

Imam Hassan Mojtabi courtyard

Grand courtyard of the Great Prophet

The operation of the sahn skeleton started in 1377 at the same time as the underpass. The pavement is constructed in a combination of Alvan, granite, and Khalid stones. Under the sahn, there is a parking lot for the shrine; and to access the shrine, two spaces connecting to the parking lots were installed on the court floor. The great courtyard of the great prophet has an area of 117,584 square metres (1,265,660 sq ft) and 55 pavilions. This court has six minarets and three porches.

Kausar courtyard

Its basement is 15,580 square metres (167,700 sq ft), it has 46 booths, and the area of the booths is 3,447 square metres (37,100 sq ft).

Ghadir courtyard

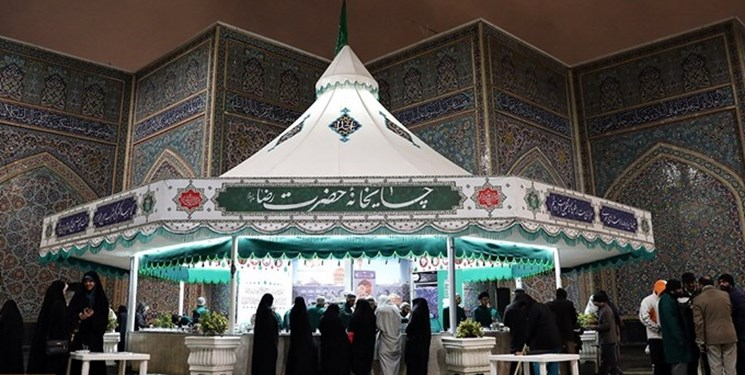
Imam Reza Tea House

There are two permanent teahouses in Kausar and Ghadir courtyard from 30:14 to 19:00.

== Porches ==
The porches of the courtyard of the revolution are:

Abbasi's porch on the north side of the courtyard

This lofty porch, called "Tabarsi Gate," is located on the north side of the Islamic Revolution courtyard, and its outer door overlooks the tomb of Sheikh Tabarsi.

The gold porch "Ivan Naderi" on the south side of the courtyard

The gold porch is located on the south side of the Islamic Revolution courtyard, and it is 21 metres (69 ft) high. This porch was built by order of Amir Ali Shir Nawai, Wazir of Sultan Hossein Biqara, in 872 AH (1467/1468 CE) because the body of this porch was gilded with gold clay during Nader Shah's time in 1148 AH (1735/1736 CE). She was known as "Ivan Naderi,"

The porch of Naqarakhana on the eastern side of the courtyard

The porch of Naqarakhana is one of the important buildings of Imam Reza's shrine. This porch is one of the works of Abbas the Great, during the Safavid era, and is 26 metres (85 ft) high, 8.7 metres (29 ft) wide, and 18.2 metres (60 ft) long. Since the Qajar era, it has been known by this name because of the restoration of the Nagara Khan building on top of it. from that

The porch of the clock on the west side of the courtyard

The clock of the Revolution Hall is also known as the deputy clock. This clock was bought by Abdul Hassan Azfar from Germany in 1333 CE and was installed on the western porch of the Revolution Hall, known as the porch of the clock, and the clock that was established there was in the courtyard of Azadi. It is said that he donated this watch to the Razavi shrine because of the vow he made for his healing.

The porches of Azadi courtyard

The porch of Bab al-Hikma is on the north side of the courtyard. The clock porch on the south side of the courtyard: the oldest clock in the shrine belonged to the Qajar era and was made in England. Some attribute its purchase to Amin al-Mulk, the brother of Mirza Ali Asghar Khan Amin al-Soltan, the chancellor of Iran during the reign of Naser al-Din Shah. Some consider it to belong to the reign of Mozaffar ad-Din Shah. According to the year of manufacture of the watch engraved on the bell in the year 1309 CE, it seems that this watch was made in the last years of Naser al-Din Shah's reign, and according to the communication facilities of that period, it was donated to Imam Reza's shrine during the time of Mozaffar al-Din Shah. This clock is installed above the western porch of the Revolution Hall on the metal tower of this porch that is 30.7 metres (101 ft) wide, 18.3 metres (60 ft) long, and is made of Aleppo materials. After that, this porch was also known as the clock porch. It is 20 metres (66 ft) higher than the old buildings of the Razavi shrine.

Bab al-Salam porch on the eastern side of the courtyard

The Bab al-Salam porch is more than 20 metres (66 ft) high, and its diameter reaches more than 7 metres (23 ft). On this porch, seven-colored tiles are superior to other patios in the Sahnehin in terms of arrangement and elegance.

The gold porch "Ivan Naseri" on the west side of the Sahneh

This porch was gilded by Azd al-Mulk Qazvini in 1282 AH. The patio is more than 20 metres (66 ft) high and is the way for women to enter the shrine. Since this porch was built and installed during the reign of Naser al-Din Shah, it is also known as the "Naseri porch." On this porch, four pavilions are built, whose body is made of golden clay. The inscriptions of this porch have verses from the Quran and poems in the Persian language.

The porches of the courtyard of the Islamic Republic

Baba al-Alam overlooks the Bast of Sheikh Tusi. There are 30-metre-high (98 ft) gold garlands above this porch.

Bab al-courtyard porch on the south side of the courtyard

This large porch and porch is built similar to the northern verandah, with two passages and a 30-metre-high (98 ft) gold garland above it.

Gold porch or Bab al-Wolayeh on the eastern side of the courtyard

It is one of the most beautiful porches in the courtyard, which is connected to the entrance of Dar al-Wolayeh and is made of gold. A bronze window is installed next to the porch.

Bab al-Ghadir porch in the west of the courtyard

This porch is similar to the gold porch in the middle of the western side of the courtyard.

The porches of the Great Prophet's courtyard

Yuan Vali Asr on the south side of the courtyard

== Porticoes ==
The complex includes the following porticoes, called dar:

- Dar al-Hafaz
- Dar al-Siadeh
- Dar al-Saada
- Guest house
- Darul Sarwar
- Dar al-Zakr
- Dar al-Azza
- Dar es Salaam

A beautiful view of the golden dome of Ali bin Musa al-Reza in the southern part of the court, the large pool with several tiny houses, and the minarets of the mosque with attractive tiles have turned this old court into one of the most beautiful parts of Imam Reza's shrine. And several different poets have mentioned it in their poems.

The Goharshad Mosque also has different shrines in its heart, with other names, including Tabrizi, Nahavandi, Najafabadi, Mayalani, Sabzevari, and Alavi. The Goharshad Mosque was built in the early 9th century of Hijri and is located in the south of Goharshad Square. It is one of the magnificent buildings of the Timurid era. This mosque has an area of 2,855 square metres (30,730 sq ft), 648 square metres (6,980 sq ft) of infrastructure, four porches, and seven chapels. The Goharshad Mosque was built in 821 AH (1418/1419 CE) by order of Mrs. Goharshad, the wife of Shahrukh Mirza Timuri, who decorated her artist son, Baysanqormirza.

== Historical events ==
Russian attack on the shrine of Imam Reza

Constitution in Khorasan

Some believe that the constitution of Khorasan, in the north of Iran differed from the constitution of the south. A combination of it can be seen in Tehran's agreement and opposition to the constitution or western and religious interpretation of the constitution. The city of Mashhad should be considered subordinate to the constitution of the North. Constitutional opponents were also active in this region, and in addition to local issues, foreign factors also contributed to this opposition. In the challenge between the constitution and the traditional system, Mashhad clerics were also divided into several groups:

- Some clerics did not accept constitutionalism from the beginning because of jurisprudence, considered it against Sharia, and even issued a fatwa against it. Seyed Ali Sistani, Seyed Baqer Razavi, Seyed Mohammad Hossein Najafi, and Sheikh Mehdi Warez Khorasani were in this group.
- Among the scholars of Mashhad, a group of supporters of constitutionalism and spiritual leaders of constitutionalism were considered. One of the pioneers of constitutionalism in Mashhad, who cooperated with the constitutionalists at the request of Akhund Khorasani, was Sheikh Zabihullah Mujtahid Quchani, who made great efforts to attract clerics to cooperate with the constitutionalists. But he did not get much success. In Mashhad, Caucasian, Badkobei, Irvani, Shirvani, and Quchani students accompanied him. Another scholar who made a pact with Quchani and accompanied him was Haj Seyyed Asdaullah Qazvini Mujtahid. In Mashhad, nobles, families, heads of nomads and clans, and leaders were against the constitution. The financial support of the constitutional movement was undertaken by several Turkish businessmen and several others. From this threshold, only Prince Siraj Al-Sultan, and Imam Juma and from Khorasan Khans, Shuja al-Mulk Hazare, and from customs, Dr. Matin Al-Sultaneh and Prince Arfa Al-Sultan, Mirza Yaqoob Sadr Ulama and Shuja Al-Tawliyeh, and from the pulpits Haj Mullah Bamanali Tehrani known as Haj The researcher cooperated with the supporters of the constitution. Jalil Mirza collaborated with Telegraph Khana. Among the scholars, Hajj Mirza Abulqasem Moin al-Gharba, Hajj Sheikh Hasan Hojjat Kashi, Hajj Sheikh Abdul Rahim Eid Ghahi, Hajj Mirza Abd al-Shakur Agha Tabrizi, Hajj Mirza Muhammad Baqir Modares Razavi, and Mirza Morteza Sarabi supported the constitutional revolution.
- The third line in Mashhad's constitutional process was Mirza Habibullah Mujtahid, who cautiously had relations with both groups and did not fully accept either of the two currents.

== Associations and parties ==
Associations and hidden and open organizations were also considered bases of popular power. At first, Feudullah and the big owners, intellectuals, and sometimes freedom-loving clerics were members of the association. But with the advancement of constitutionalism, workers and farmers also appeared in these associations. Among the most essential and effective associations and parties in Mashhad, the following groups can be mentioned:

- Twelver Association: led by Haj Asdaullah Qazvini
- Saadat Association: This association was established in connection with the Istanbul Saadat Association and Bad Kobe freedom fighters in Mashhad, with members from various groups. It lasted for several years and controlled national movements.
- The Razavi Association: which was headed by Mirza Habibullah Mujtahid. It was formed at the beginning of constitutionalism and was destroyed during the dictatorship.
- State and Provincial Association: which started in Mashhad under the chairmanship of Mirza Habibullah Mujtahid.
- The Companions of Saracheh: the people of knowledge and scholars of education and reformers gathered together in a small house near the Goharshad Jame Mosque. And following the Companions of Safa, they called themselves Companions of Saracha and were thinking of reforming the society. Haj Mirza Mojtahed Khorasani, Haj Faconstitutional revolution's victory underzel Khorasani, Seyyed Ali Khan Darghazi, and Seyed Mohammad Amin Al-Hakmai Sabzevari were members of this association. Also, Zain al-Abidin Sabzevari was one of its most influential members.
- Hizb Mujahid: Hizb Mujahid of Mashhad is the oldest political party in the history of Iran. This party was created with a secret organization before the constitutional revolution's victory under Heydar Khan Amwaughli. Its ideology was influenced by the Hemat Party, a branch of the Russian Social Democratic Party.
- Two moderate and revolutionary parties were active in Mashhad and called the Democratic Party for a while.

== See also ==
- List of imamzadehs in Iran
- List of mausoleums in Iran
- Shia Islam in Iran
- Holiest sites in Shia Islam
