= Baramkeh =

Baramkeh البرامكة
- Neighborhood
- Location in Syria
- Coordinates: 33°30′22″N 36°17′12″E
- Country: Syria
- Governorate: Damascus Governorate
- Subdistrict: Damascus
- Municipality: Qanawat

Population (2004)
  - Total: 14,969

Baramkeh (Arabic: البرامكة), named after Barmakids, is a neighborhood and district of the Qanawat municipality of Damascus, Syria. It had a population of 14,969 in the 2004 census. The neighborhood was founded during the late 19th century, during Ottoman rule. A military secondary school was established in Baramkeh in 1890s. The district contains a campus of the Damascus University.
