= Sarouja =

Coordinates: 33°30′55.5″N 36°17′55″E

Sarouja سَارُوجَة
- Municipality
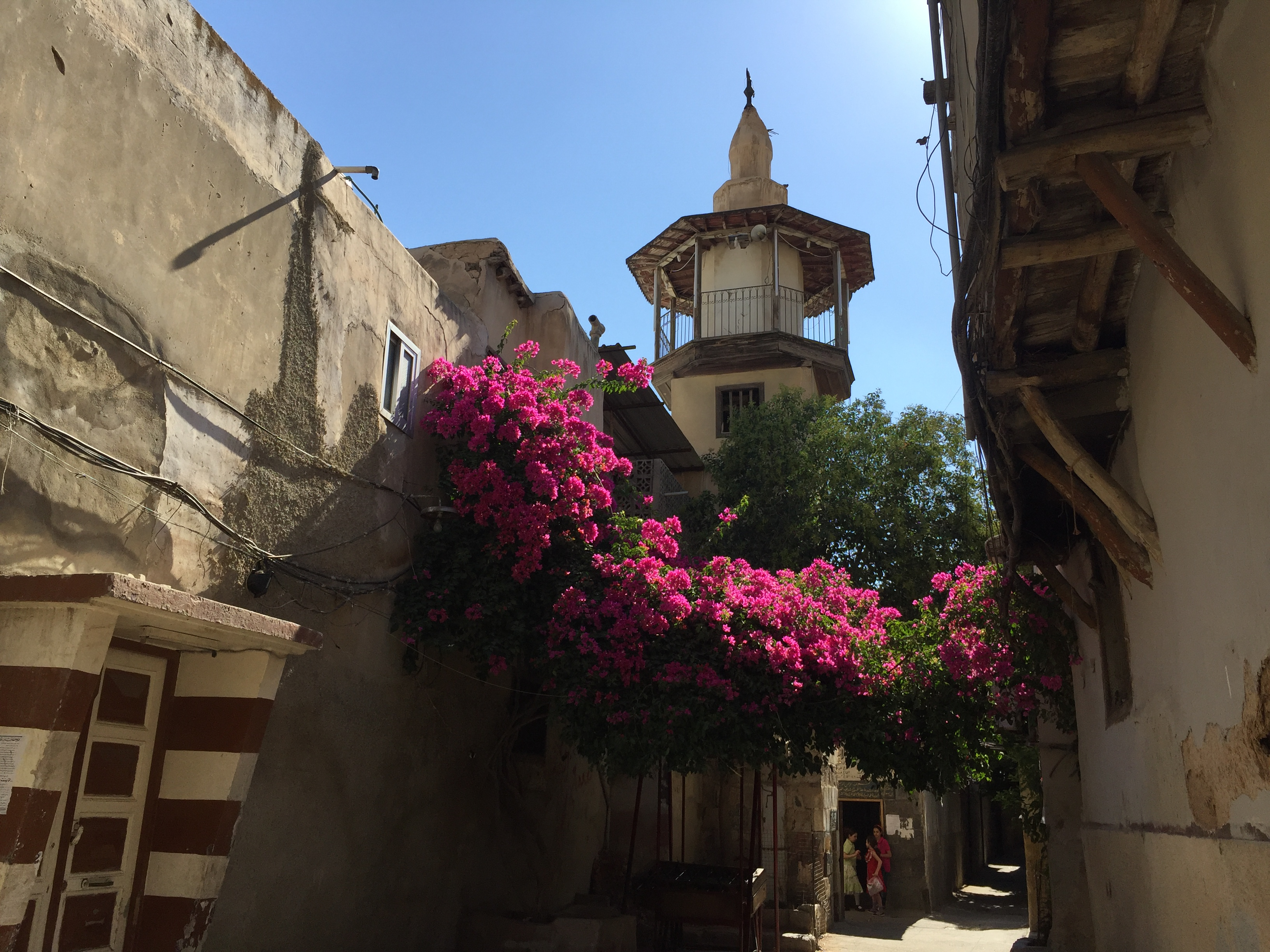
- Al-Jarn Al-Aswad Mosque in Sarouja

- Country: Syria
- Governorate: Damascus Governorate
- City: Damascus

Population (2004)
  - Total: 83,814
- Time zone: UTC+2 (EET)
  - Summer (DST): UTC+3 (EEST)
- Climate: BSk

Sarouja (Arabic: سَارُوجَة, romanized: Sārūjah) is a municipality of Damascus, Syria, due north of the Old Damascus. It was the first part of Damascus to be built outside the city walls in the 13th century.

== Etymology ==
The name comes from the word Turkish: Sarıca, which means yellow (as some researchers mention). The name of the neighborhood is also attributed to one of its leaders, who is Sarim Al-Din Sarouja, who died in 1342.

== History ==
After this neighborhood was established by Mamluks, it was vandalized as a result of the conflicts of the princes in the Mamluk period, which led to the destruction of the entire Levantine Barani school and the situation worsened after Tamerlane occupied Damascus in 14th century. The place of the neighborhood became a base for his catapults that were bombing the Damascus Citadel, and the matter did not stop at this neighborhood, as Tamerlane burned Damascus, including Sarouja neighborhood, before withdrawing from it.

The neighborhood is famous for its souk, in addition to hammams, mosques and madrasas, dating back to the Mamluk Sultanate.

On the 16th July 2023 a fire broke in the area destroying a large number of historic buildings, including the Palace of Abdul Rahman Pasha Al-Yusuf as well as partially destroying Al-Azm Palace, which contains the Center for Historical Documents.

== Districts ==
- Al-Adwi (pop. 16,088)
- Al-Amarah (pop. 2,159)
- Fares al-Khoury (pop. 8,970)
- Masjid Aqsab (pop. 14,148)
- Al-Qassaa (pop. 11,467)
- Al-Qusour (pop. 15,568)
- Al-Uqaybah (pop. 8,813)
- Sarouja (pop. 6,601)
