= Qadam railway station =

Railway station of Latakia, Syria

Qaddam
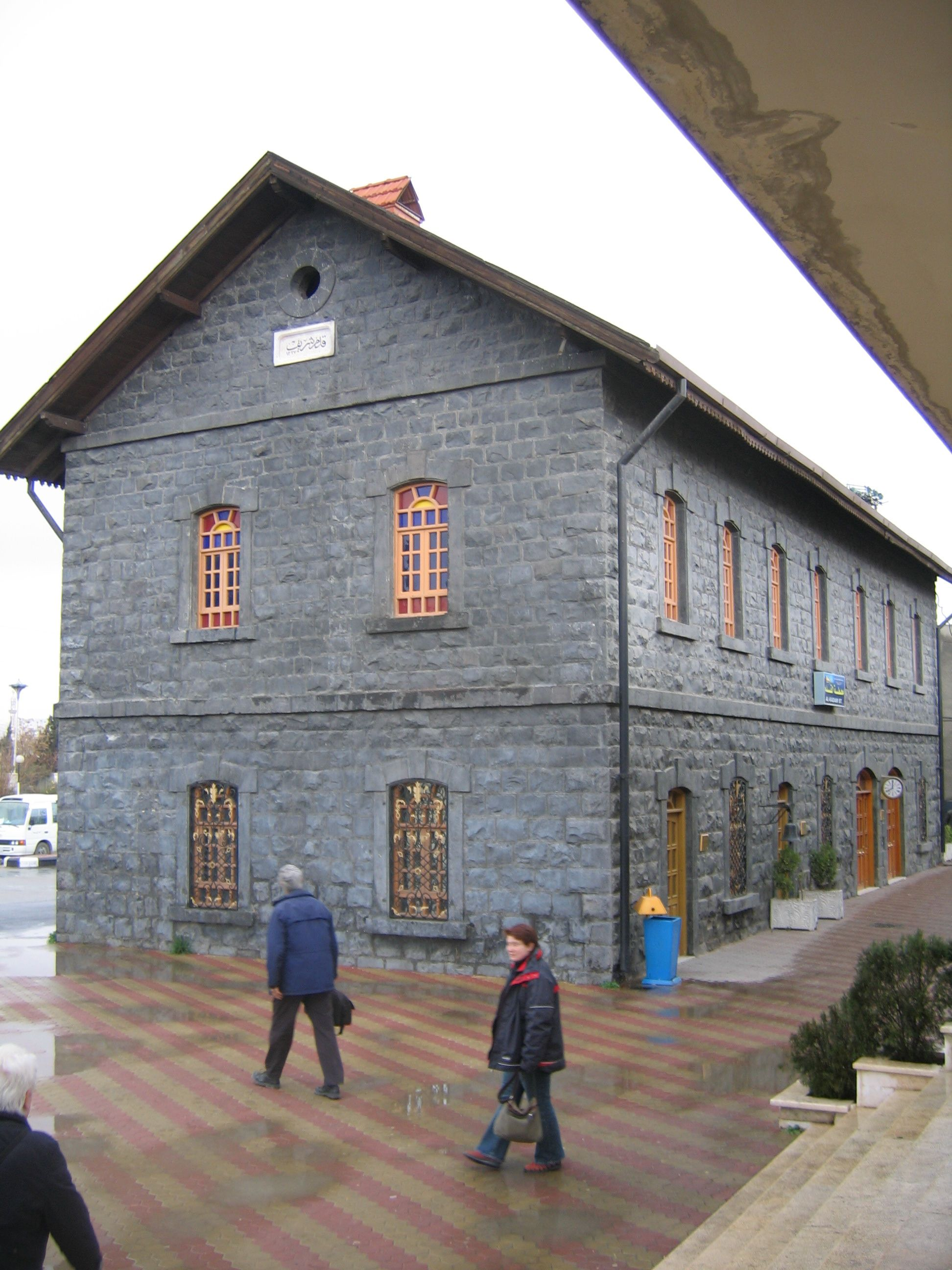
- Main building

General information
- Location: Qadam district, Damascus; Syria
- Coordinates: 33°28′35.7″N 36°17′26.7″E
- Owner: Syrian Ministry of Transport
- Operator: Syrian Railways
- Line: Damascus–Aleppo line
- Platforms: 4 (2 island platform and 2 side platforms)
- Tracks: 6

Construction
- Structure type: At-grade

History
- Opened: 1900s
Location

Qadam railway station (Arabic: محطة القدم, romanized: Maḥaṭṭat al-Qadam; also known as al-Qadam or Kadam) is a historic railway station located in the Qadam district on the southern outskirts of Damascus, Syria. It was constructed in the early 20th century.

== History ==
The station was built in the early 1900s as part of the Hejaz railway. After the fall of the Ottoman Empire, Qadam became one of the main railway stations in Syria. It linked Damascus with cities such as Aleppo, and also with Jordan.

The station included workshops and other railway facilities. It also had a small collection of old trains.

After the Syrian civil war began in 2011, the station was used by forces loyal to the Ba'athist regime. It was badly damaged during fighting in 2013, including damage to buildings and trains. Train services across much of Syria stopped during this time. Some limited services ran again in 2018.

As of 2025, there are plans to repair parts of the railway network, with possible help from Turkey and nearby countries.

== Gallery ==
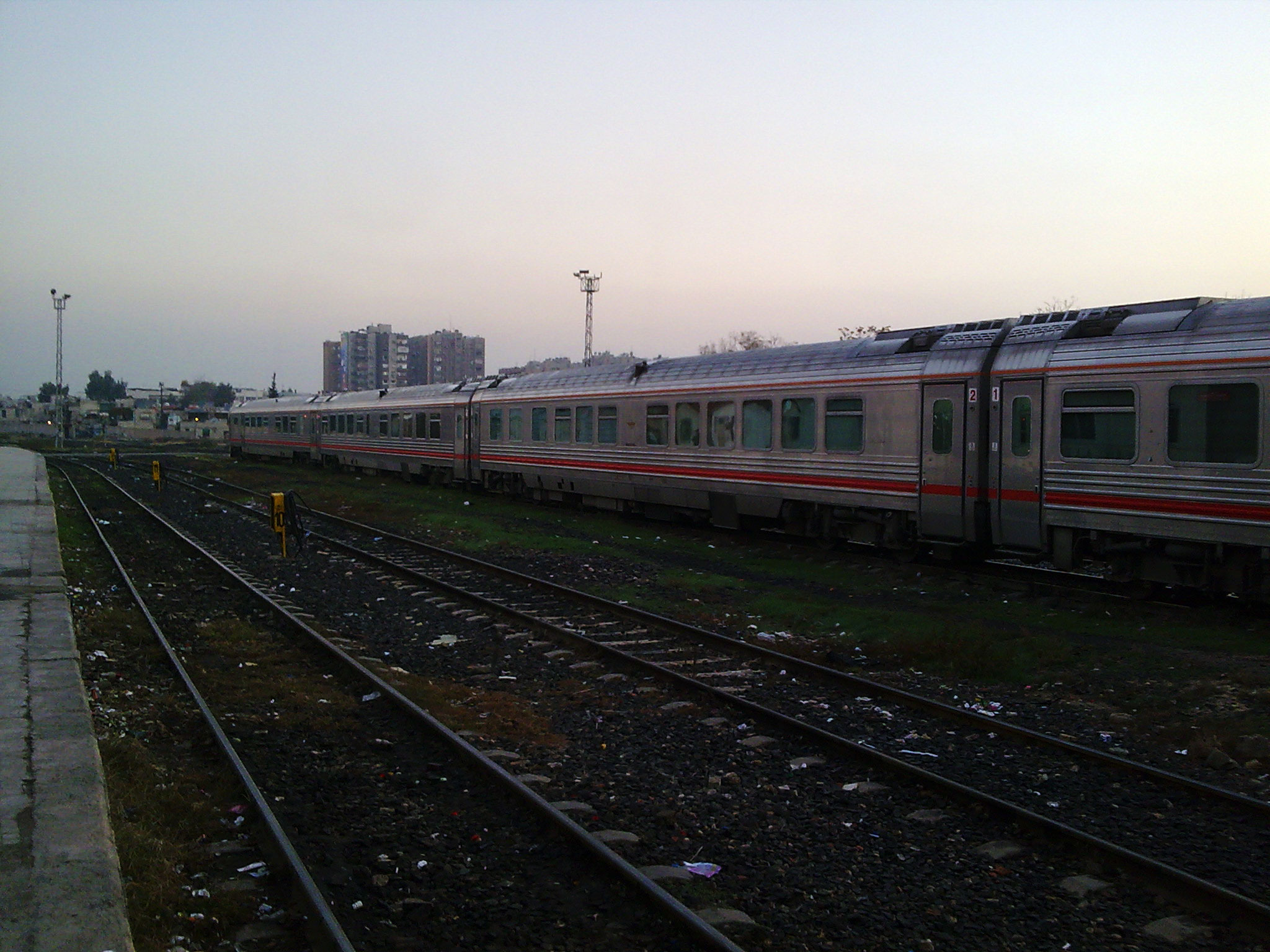
Trackside view with a DMU-5 locomotive in the background.

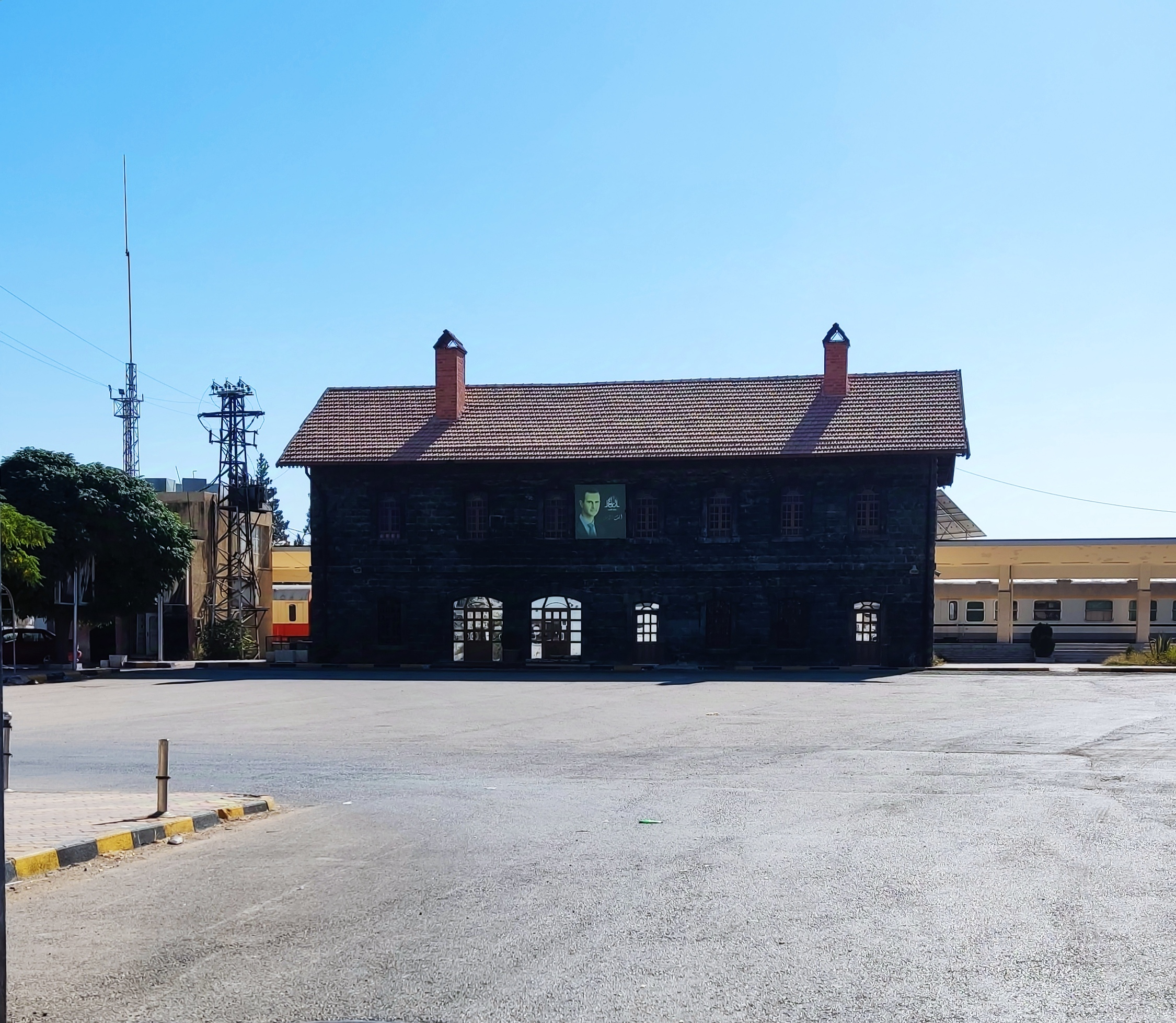
Station building
