= Al-Hijaz, Damascus =

Al-Hijaz الحجاز
- Neighborhood
- Location in Syria
- Coordinates: 33°30′39″N 36°17′32″E
- Country: Syria
- Governorate: Damascus Governorate
- Subdistrict: Damascus
- Municipality: Qanawat

Population (2004)
  - Total: 5,572

Al-Hijaz (Arabic: الحجاز) is a neighborhood and district of the Qanawat municipality of Damascus, Syria. It had a population of 5,572 in the 2004 census. The neighborhood was founded during the early 20th century, during the last years of Ottoman rule in Syria. It was built around the Hijaz Railway station in the city, which was founded in 1913. Between 1914 and 1916, the Ottoman governor of Damascus, Jamal Pasha, commissioned the construction of Shari'a an-Naser (Victory Street) in the neighborhood, which ran from the railway station to the Souq al-Hamidiyya bazaar, parallel to Marjeh Square and the Barada River. Several mosques and residences were demolished to make way for the monumental road.
