= Barazek =

Levantine sesame cookie

Barazeq
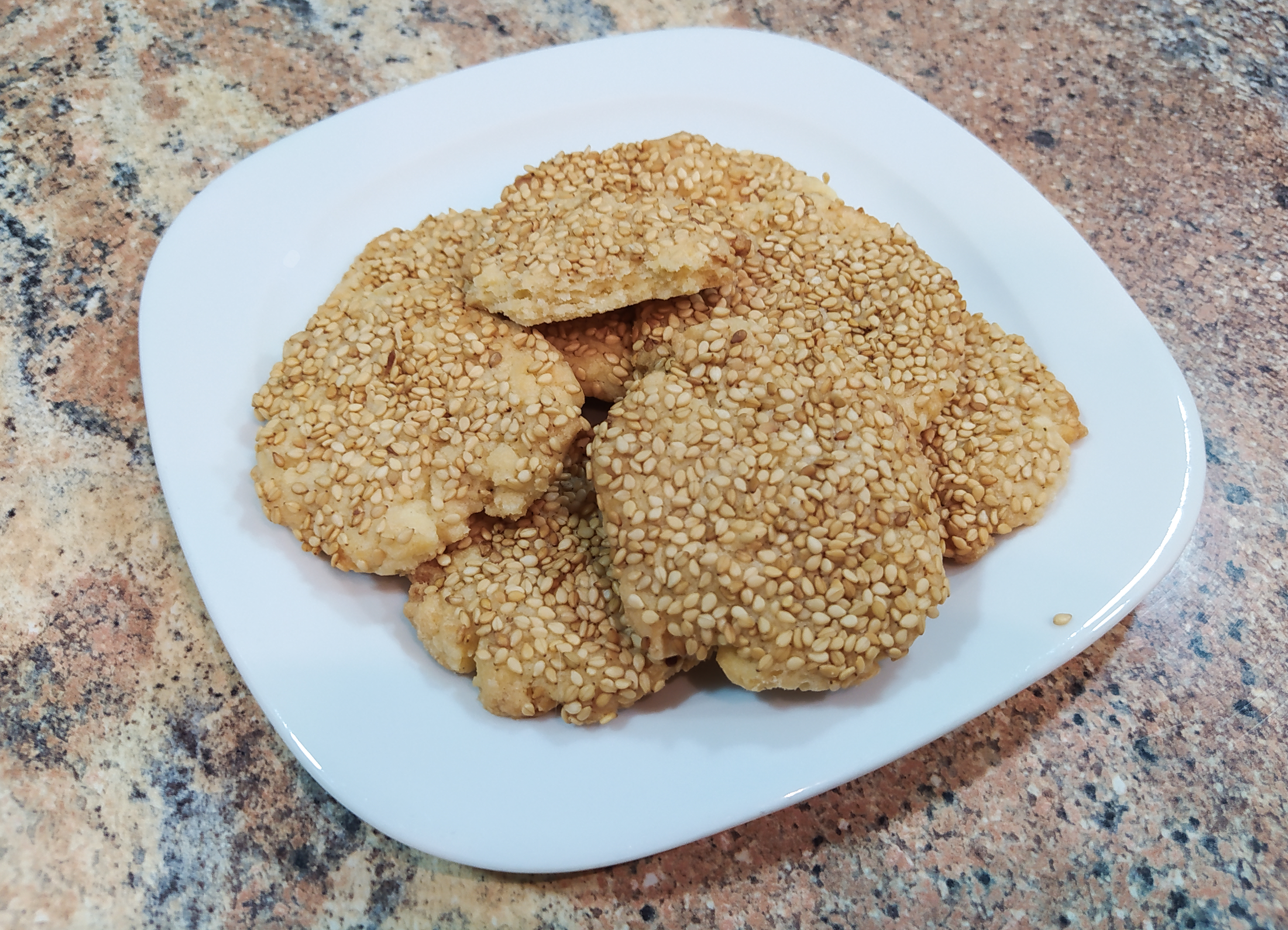
- Alternative names: Barazik
- Type: cookie
- Place of origin: Levant
- Region or state: Al-Midan, Damascus, Syria
- Main ingredients: flour, butter, icing sugar, egg yolk, sesame

Barazek or barazeq (Arabic: برازق, romanized: barāzeq) is a Levantine cookie whose main ingredient is sesame (Arabic: سمسم, romanized: sumsum) and often also contain pieces of pistachio. It probably originated during Ottoman rule in the Syrian capital, Damascus, particularly in the Al-Midan neighborhood, although today it is so popular that it can be found in most pastry shops throughout the Levantine area (Lebanon, Jordan, Palestine and Syria) and the broader Arab world. It is also one of the more traditional Palestinian desserts and it is easy to find stalls selling barazek on the streets of Jerusalem.

== History ==
19th century Orientalist Reinhart Dozy described barāziq as a wheat bread topped with either dibs (syrup) or butter and sesame in his 1881 dictionary Supplément aux dictionnaires arabes. Barazeq was later described in an 1891 text by the International Congress of Orientalists as a cake, 20-30cm in diameter, baked in butter, either covered with sesame on one side, or plain (سادة). In 1898, Orientalists Albert Socin and Immanuel Benzinger also described thin barazik coated with grape-syrup, butter, and sesame being sold in Damascus as a "finer kind of bread".

In his book Dictionary of Damascene Industries, Syrian author Zafir al-Qasimi wrote about barāziqī; a profession referring to sellers of baraziq. He described baraziq made from yeasted, sweetened dough shaped into small or large sesame-coated disks, and noted that their sale was especially common during Ramadan, and observed that some vendors produced cheaper, lower-quality baraziq using fat or sesame oil (شيرج) in place of samneh.

Syrian historian Khayr al-Din al-Asadi described barazeq as "thin flatbreads covered in sesame" in his 1981 book Comparative Encyclopedia of Aleppo.

== Variations ==
The barazeq made in the Old City of Jerusalem are, unlike the cookie shaped barazeq found elsewhere, large, very thin and flat, and made in wood fired ovens. They are most popular during Ramadan.

Barazeq is traditionally made from flour, clarified butter (samneh), sugar, sesame, pistachios, and yeast. Besides nuts and seeds, traditional toppings include dibs (fruit syrup) or qatir.

It has a sweet, buttery and nutty flavor, and a crisp and brittle texture.

== Gallery ==
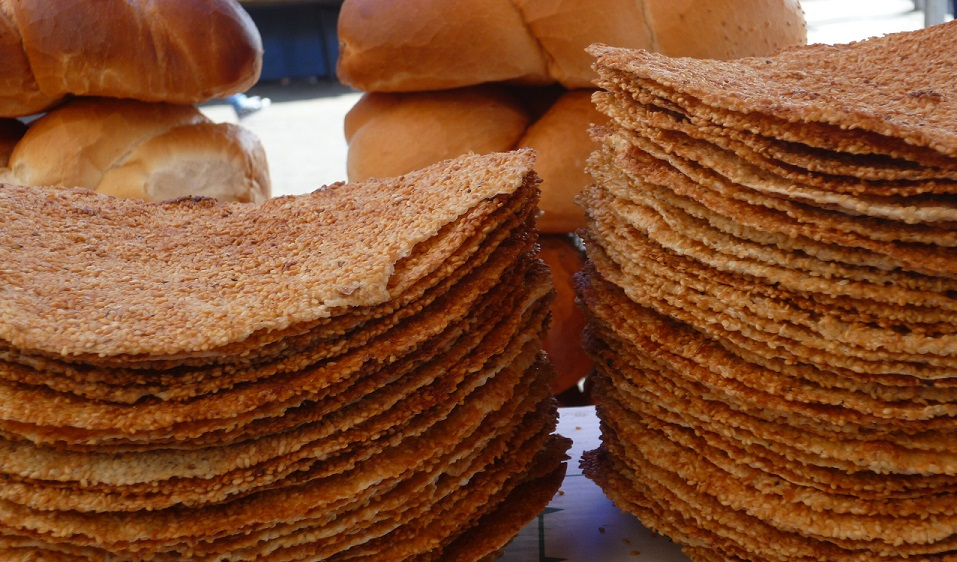
A stack of Jerusalem-style barazeq in East Jerusalem

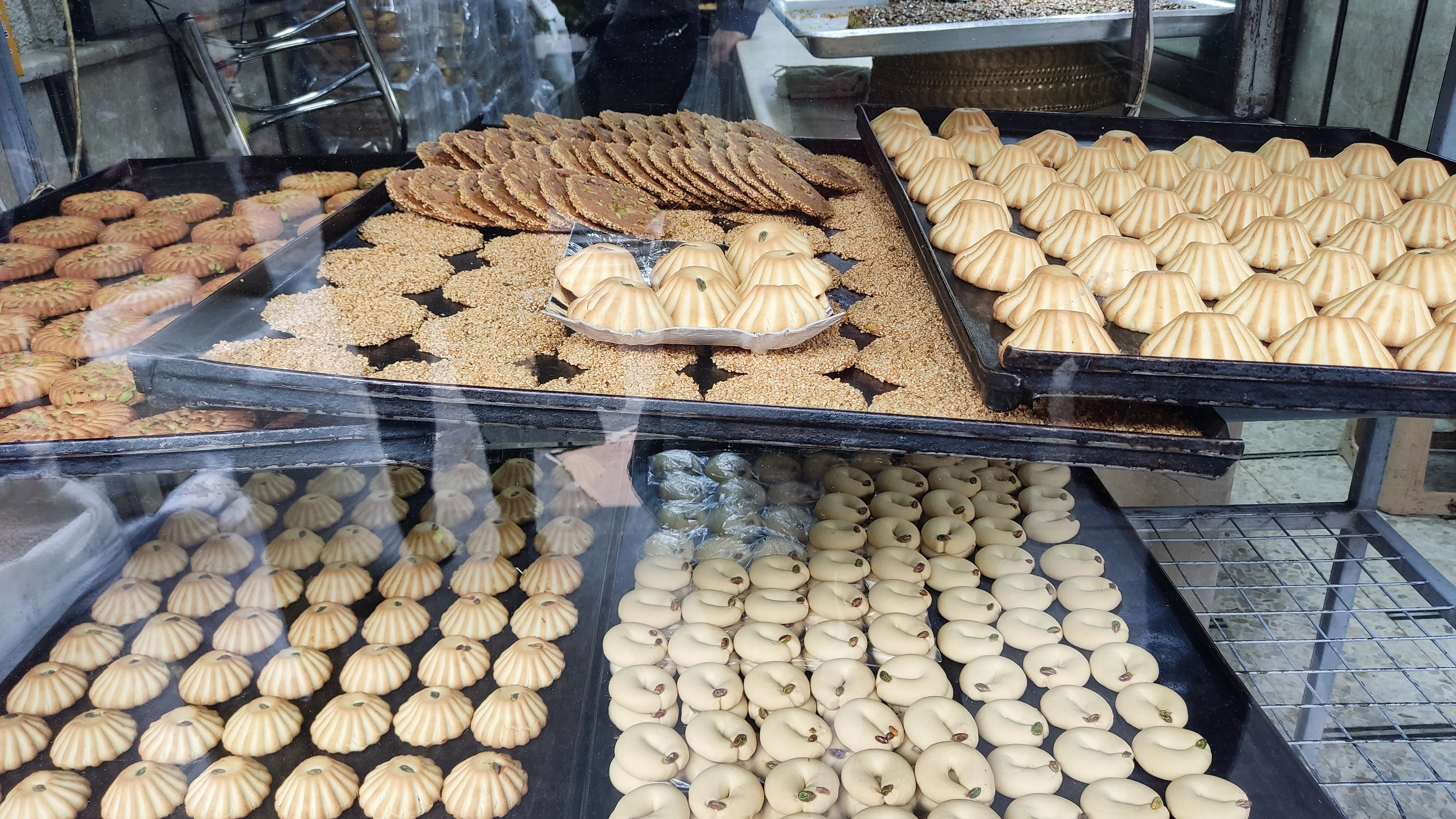
Barazeq (top) seen with other desserts in Syria, pistachio-studded bottom is visible.
