= Abu Jarash =

Abu Jarash أبو جرش
- Neighborhood
- Location in Syria
- Coordinates: 33°31′56″N 36°17′25″E
- Country: Syria
- Governorate: Damascus Governorate
- Subdistrict: Damascus
- Municipality: Al-Salihiyah

Population (2004)
  - Total: 12,798

Abu Jarash (Arabic: أبو جرش) is a neighborhood and district of the al-Salihiyah municipality of Damascus, Syria. It had a population of 12,798 in the 2004 census. In the 1936 French Mandate census, Abu Jarash had a population of 9,600, all Muslims. The neighborhood was built around the domed mausoleum of Abu Jarash, also known as Abdallah ibn Sala al-Raqqi, a high-ranking Ayyubid royal court official.
