= Al-Zahra al-Jadeeda =

- Neighbourhood
- Location within Damascus
- Coordinates: 33°29′22″N 36°18′9″E
- Country: Syria
- Governorate: Damascus
- City: Damascus
- Municipality: Al-Midan

Population (2004)
  - Total: 24,863

Al-Zahra al-Jadeeda is a neighbourhood of Damascus, Syria. It lies within the Al-Midan municipality, east of the Al-Midan neighbourhood.
