= Qanawat, Damascus =

Qanawat ٱلْقَنَوَات
- Municipality
- Qanawat on the District map of Damascus

- Location in Damascus Qanawat (Syria)
- Coordinates: 33°29′54″N 36°16′38″E
- Country: Syria
- Governorate: Damascus Governorate
- City: Damascus

Population (2004)
  - Total: 58,053
- Time zone: UTC+2 (EET)
  - Summer (DST): UTC+3 (EEST)
- Climate: BSk

Qanawat (Arabic: ٱلْقَنَوَات, romanized: al-Qanawāt) is a municipality of the Damascus, Syria, due west of the Old City. In the 2004 census, it had a population of 58,053. The municipality contains numerous government buildings such as the University of Damascus, National Museum of Damascus, Damascus Governorate Police headquarters, and the Ministries of Tourism, Information, and Interior. It also features historical places of interest such as the Hejaz Railway, the Sulaymaniyya Takiyya, and Hammam al-Jadid.

== History ==
The name Qanawat, Arabic for "channels", refers to the ruins of a historical Roman aqueduct in the Qanawat district. The Bab Sreijeh district contains the Mamluk-era Arab Hammam al-Jadid.

In July 2012, during the Syrian Civil War, the Free Syrian Army Rebels attacked the police headquarters compound.

== Districts ==
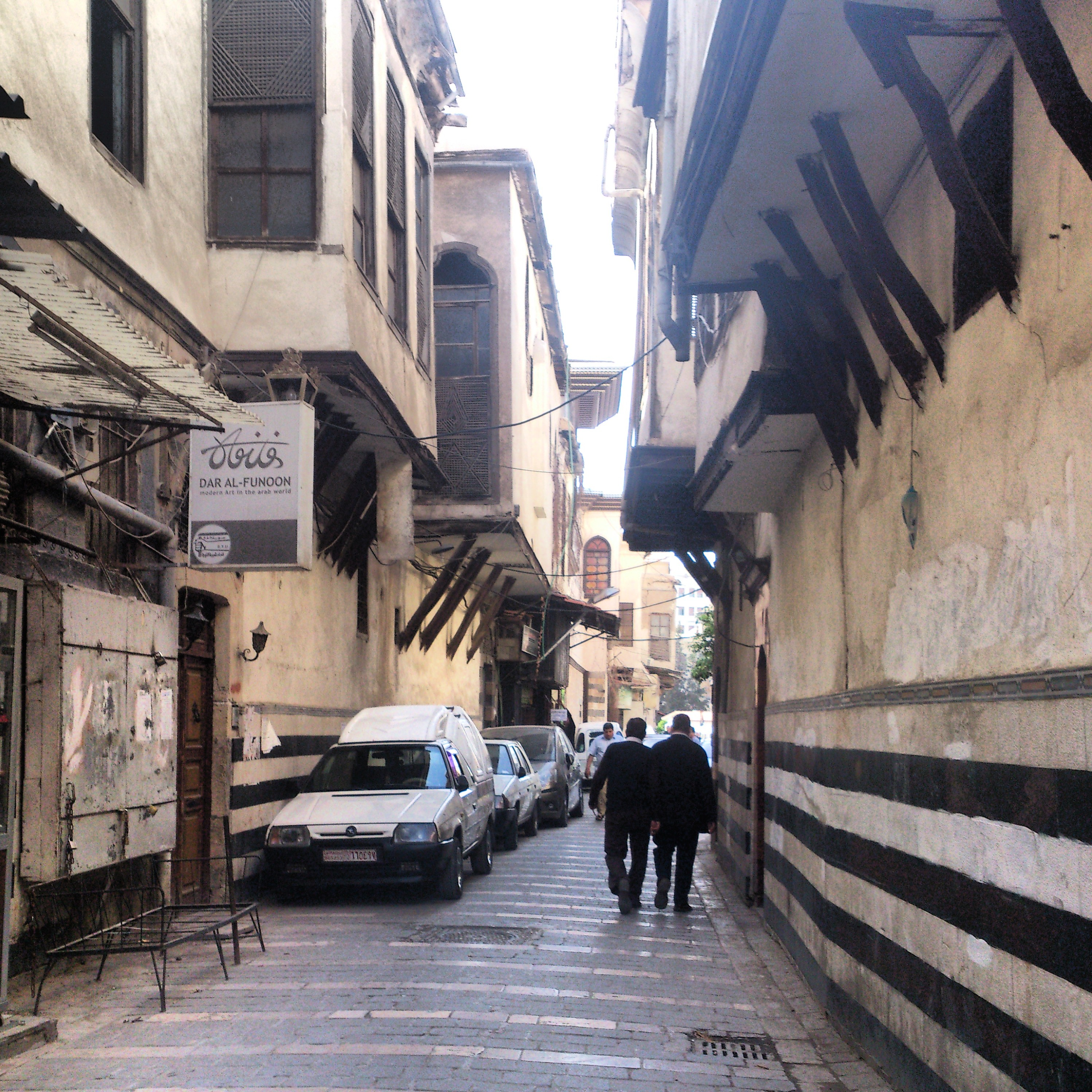
A street in Qanawat

- Ansari (pop. 9,552)
- Bab al-Jabiyah (pop. 3,697)
- Bab Sreijeh (pop. 5,612)
- Baramkeh (pop. 14,969)
- Al-Hijaz (pop. 5,572)
- Mujtahid (pop. 3,061)
- Qanawat (pop. 4,610)
- Qabr Atikah (pop. 7,213)
- Al-Suwayqah (pop. 3,767)
