= Al-Midan =

Coordinates: 33°29′N 36°17′E

Al Midan الميدان
- Municipality
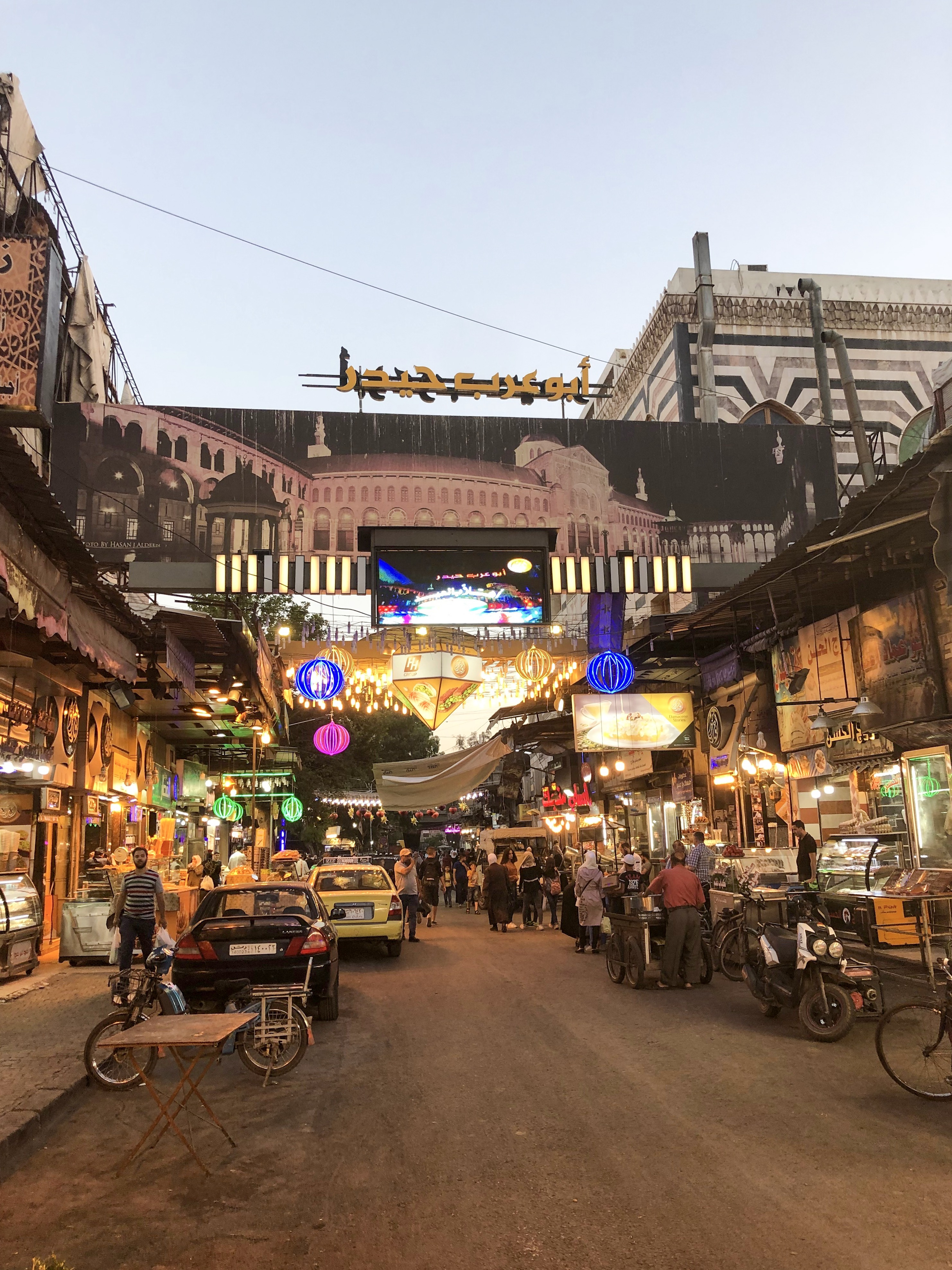
- Midan Souk - Jezmatieh Street

- Country: Syria
- Governorate: Damascus Governorate
- City: Damascus

Population (2004)
  - Total: 177,456
- Time zone: UTC+2 (EET)
  - Summer (DST): UTC+3 (EEST)
- Climate: BSk

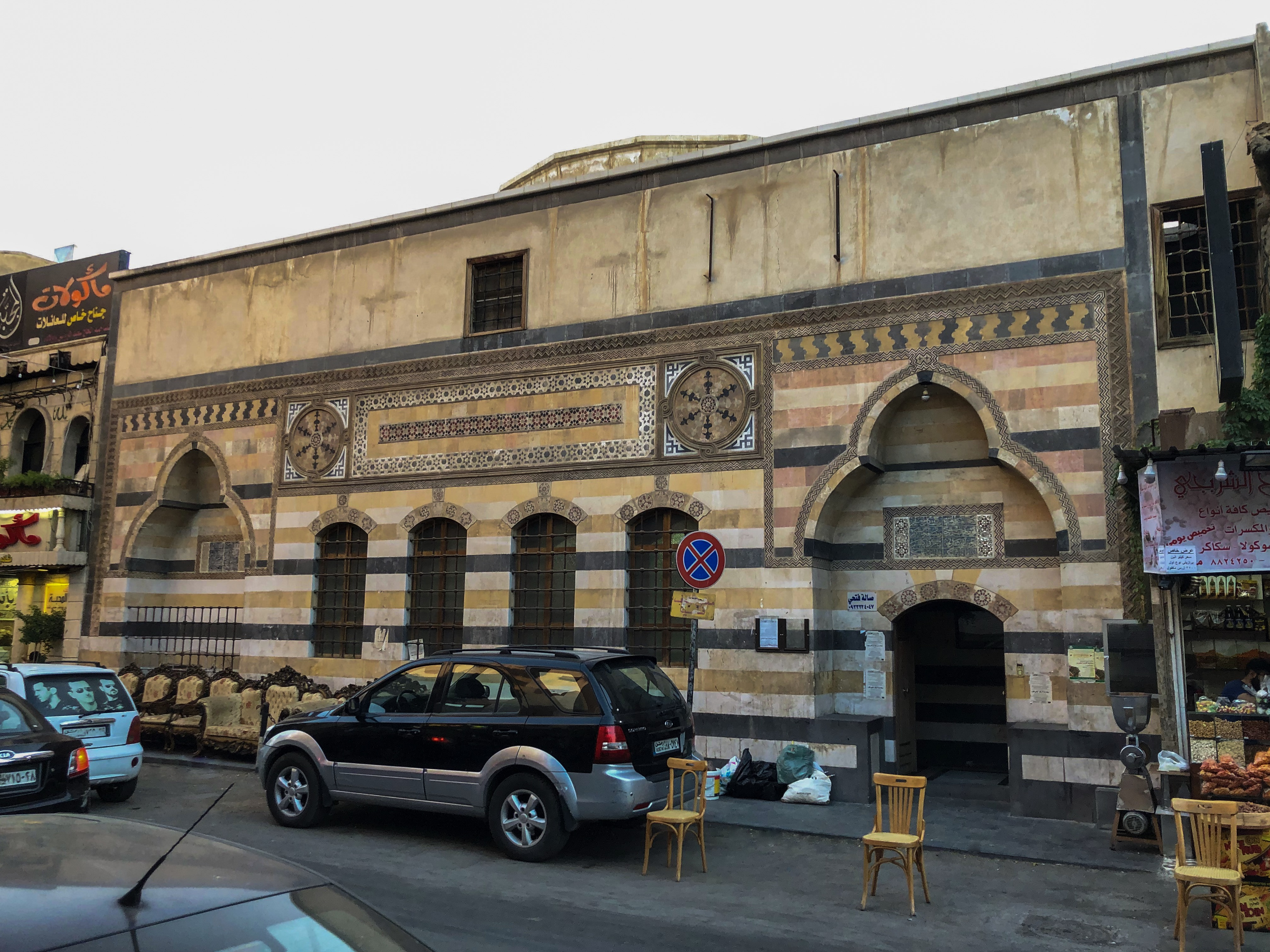
Al-Midan, Jezmatieh Street

Al-Midan (Arabic: حي الميدان) is a neighbourhood and municipality in Damascus, Syria, south of the old walled city and near the modern city centre. In the 2004 census, it had a population of 177,456. Today, the neighbourhood is often considered to be one of the most conservative in Damascus.

== Etymology ==
The name Midan is derived from Midan Al Hassa (Arabic: ميدان الحصى) or the field of gravel. The neighbourhood was located between two sub Barada streams and when it rained heavily, the land gravel deposits filled the streams and consequently, the neighbourhood.

== History ==
Al-Midan neighborhood in 1929

Al-Midan started during the Mamluk rule over Damascus. It took its final form about 400 years ago during the Ottoman empire and has not experienced any major changes since. It is considered the Southern Gate of Damascus and was created as a trading center by the people of Damascus for them to be closer to the people of the Hauran and to improve trade and economic relations between them.

During the French occupation, the people of Midan revolted aggressively against the French and thus suffered heavy bombing during the Great Syrian Revolt of 1925–1927. Their actions were driven in part by the extensive commercial links connecting the grain merchants of the neighborhood with Druze notables in the Hawran, among whom the revolt had begun.

Michel Aflaq and Salah al-Din al-Bitar, the founders of the Ba'ath Party, were both born in the Midan as sons of grain merchants.

The neighborhood was and still is (compared to other neighbourhoods in Damascus) very conservative.

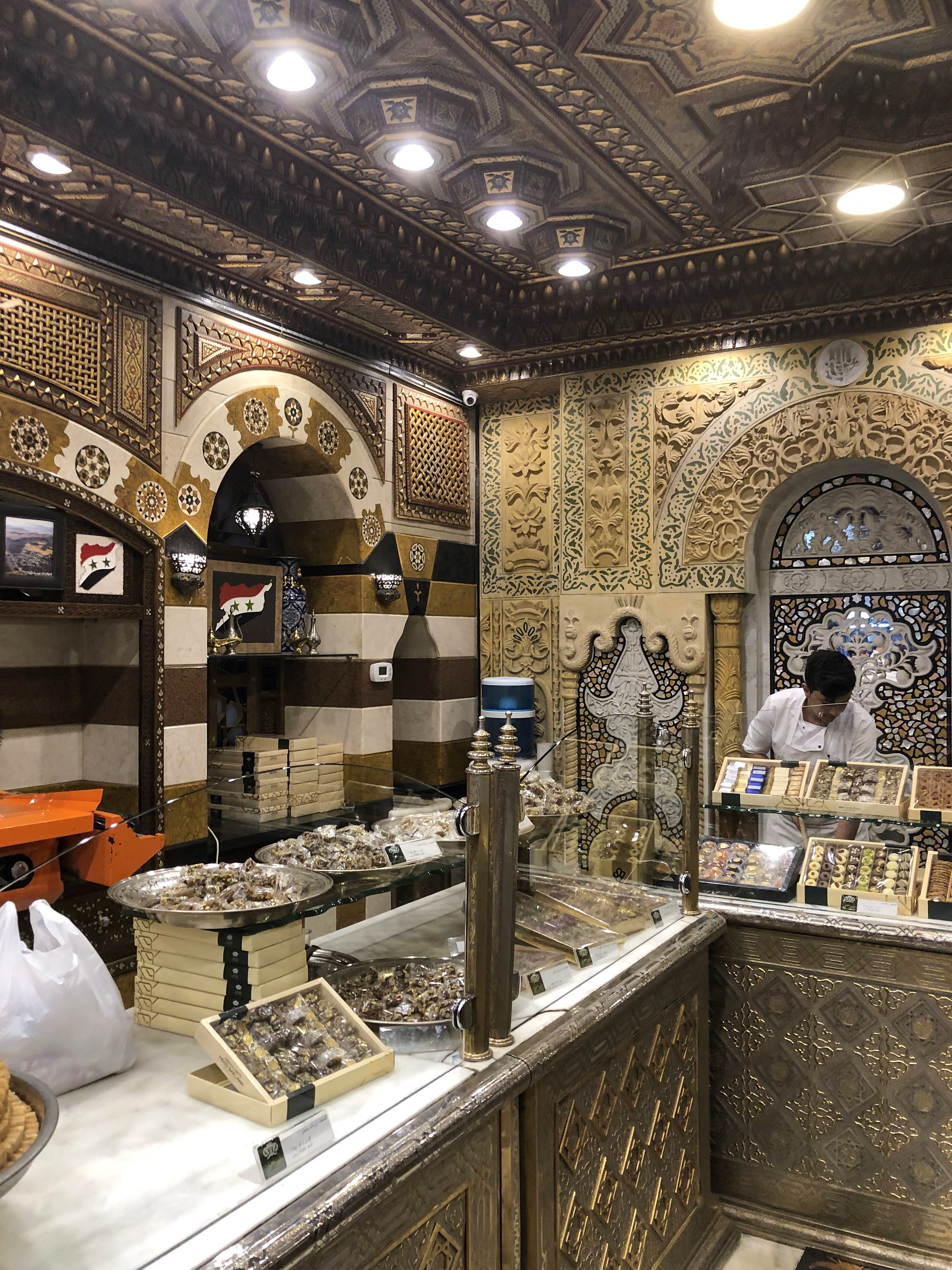
Traditional Midani Sweet Shop

Some of the sweets for which Midan is famous for include baklava, barazek, kanafeh, namorah, and awameh.

== Districts ==
- Bab Musalla (pop. 11,330)
- Daqaq (pop. 10,858)
- Al-Haqleh (pop. 8,076)
- Al-Qa'a (pop. 11,791)
- Midan al-Wastani (pop. 23,745)
- Al-Tadamon (pop. 86,793)
- Az-Zahreh (pop. 24,863)

== Notable historic figures ==
- Abd al-Ghani al-Ghunaymi al-Maydani

== See also ==
- January 2012 al-Midan bombing

== Bibliography ==
- Batatu, Hanna (2000). The Old Social Classes and New Revolutionary Movements of Iraq (3rd ed.). Saqi Books. ISBN 0863565204.
