= Al-Qassaa =

Al-Qassaa القصاع
- Neighborhood
- Location in Syria
- Coordinates: 33°31′7″N 36°18′57″E
- Country: Syria
- Governorate: Damascus Governorate
- Subdistrict: Damascus
- Municipality: Sarouja

Population (2004)
  - Total: 21,731

Al-Qassaa (Arabic: القصاع; also spelled Qasa' or Qasa'ah) is a neighborhood and district of the Sarouja municipality in Damascus, Syria. Qassaa is situated in the northeastern part of the city and borders the Old City neighborhood of Bab Tuma. It had a population of 11,467 in the 2004 census. Al-Qassaa's inhabitants are predominantly upper class Christians.

== Etymology ==
Al-Qassaa was famous for the manufacture of clay porringer; from which it gained its name.

== History ==
Al-Qassaa was founded in the early 20th century, during the last years of Ottoman rule. The people who established the neighborhood were Christians from the Old City neighborhood of Bab Tuma who moved to al-Qassaa due to the increasingly difficult living conditions in Bab Tuma's ancient buildings and narrow alleys. The people of Bab Tuma felt secure enough to move into the unwalled suburbs of the Old City due to the increased protection established by the Ottomans in the aftermath of the 1860 massacre of Christians in Damascus. Al-Qassaa was further developed during the French Mandatory period, being designed along the lines devised by French architect Michel Ecochard. In the 1936 French Mandate census, al-Qassaa had a population 1,872, all Christians.
