= Qadam =

Qadam ٱلْقَدَم al-Kadam, Kadam
- Municipality

Arab transcription(s)
  - English: "The foot"
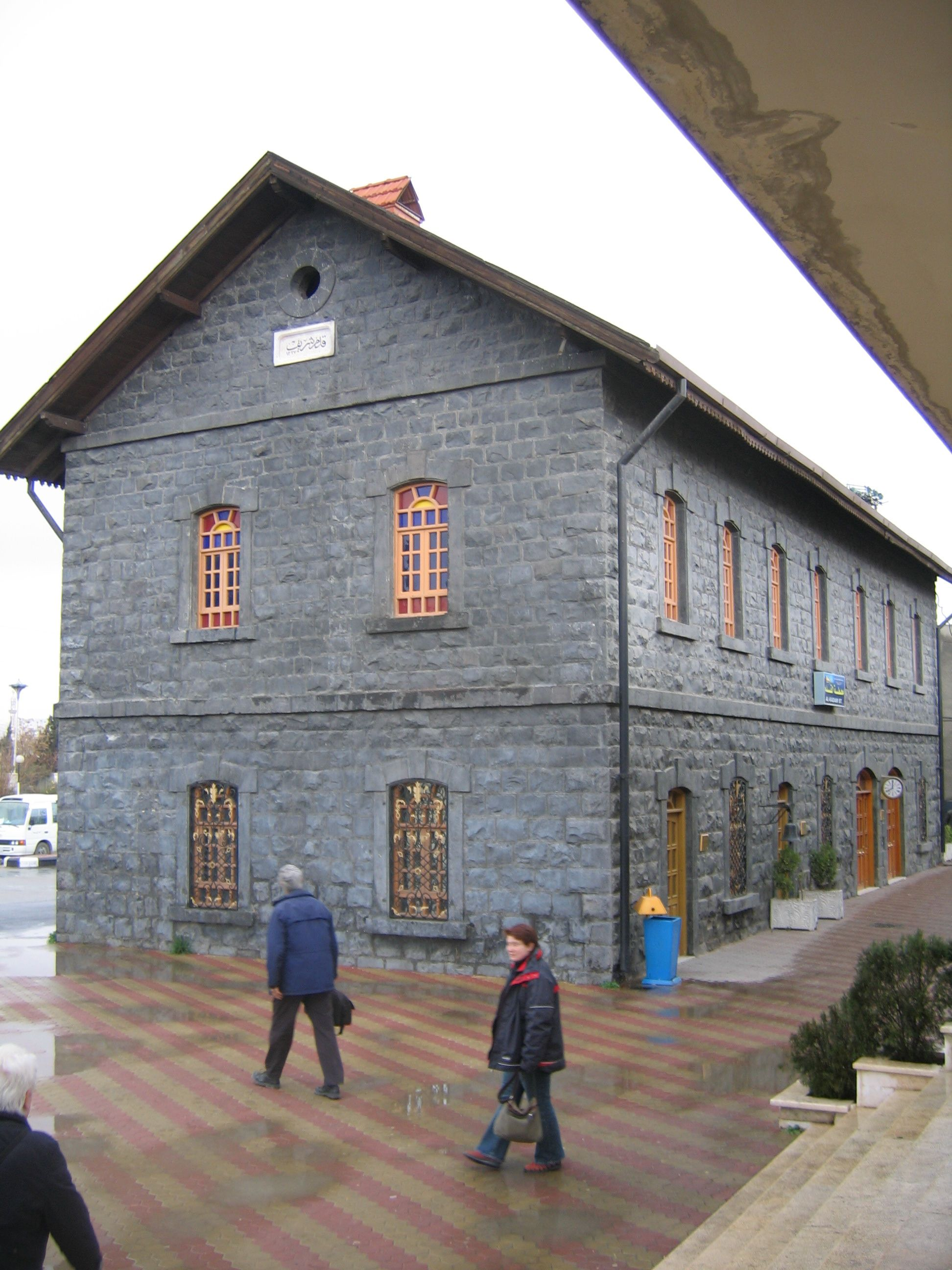
- Main Syrian Railways train station in Qadam

- Al-Qadam depicted as Al-Kadam on a map of the municipalities of Damascus
- Coordinates: 33°28′00″N 36°17′00″E
- Country: Syria
- Governorate: Damascus Governorate
- City: Damascus

Population (2004)
  - Total: 95,944
- Time zone: UTC+3 (EET)
  - Summer (DST): UTC+2 (EEST)
- Climate: BSk

Qadam (Arabic: ٱلْقَدَم, romanized: al-Qadam) is a municipality and a neighborhood in the southern part of Damascus, Syria, due west of Yarmouk Camp.

== History ==
Prior to its urbanization and integration into the Damascus municipality, al-Qadam was a village on the Hajj caravan road called al-Qadam al-Sharif (the Noble Foot). It was named after a stone originally from Bosra said to show a footprint of Muhammad. The stone was relocated from Bosra to a mosque in al-Qadam.

The area saw heavy fighting during the Syrian civil war, given the strategic importance of the Qadam railway station.

== Districts ==
- Al-Asali (pop. 21,731)
- Dahadil (pop. 14,310)
- Jouret al-Shreibati (8,836)
- Al-Mustafa (pop. 9,218)
- Al-Qadam (pop. 18,649)
- Qadam Sharqi (pop. 4,022)
- Al-Sayyidah Aisha (pop. 19,178)
