= Al-Salihiyah, Damascus =

Municipality and neighborhood of Damascus, Syria

Al-Salihiyah الصَّالِحِيَّة aṣ-Ṣāliḥiyya
- Municipality
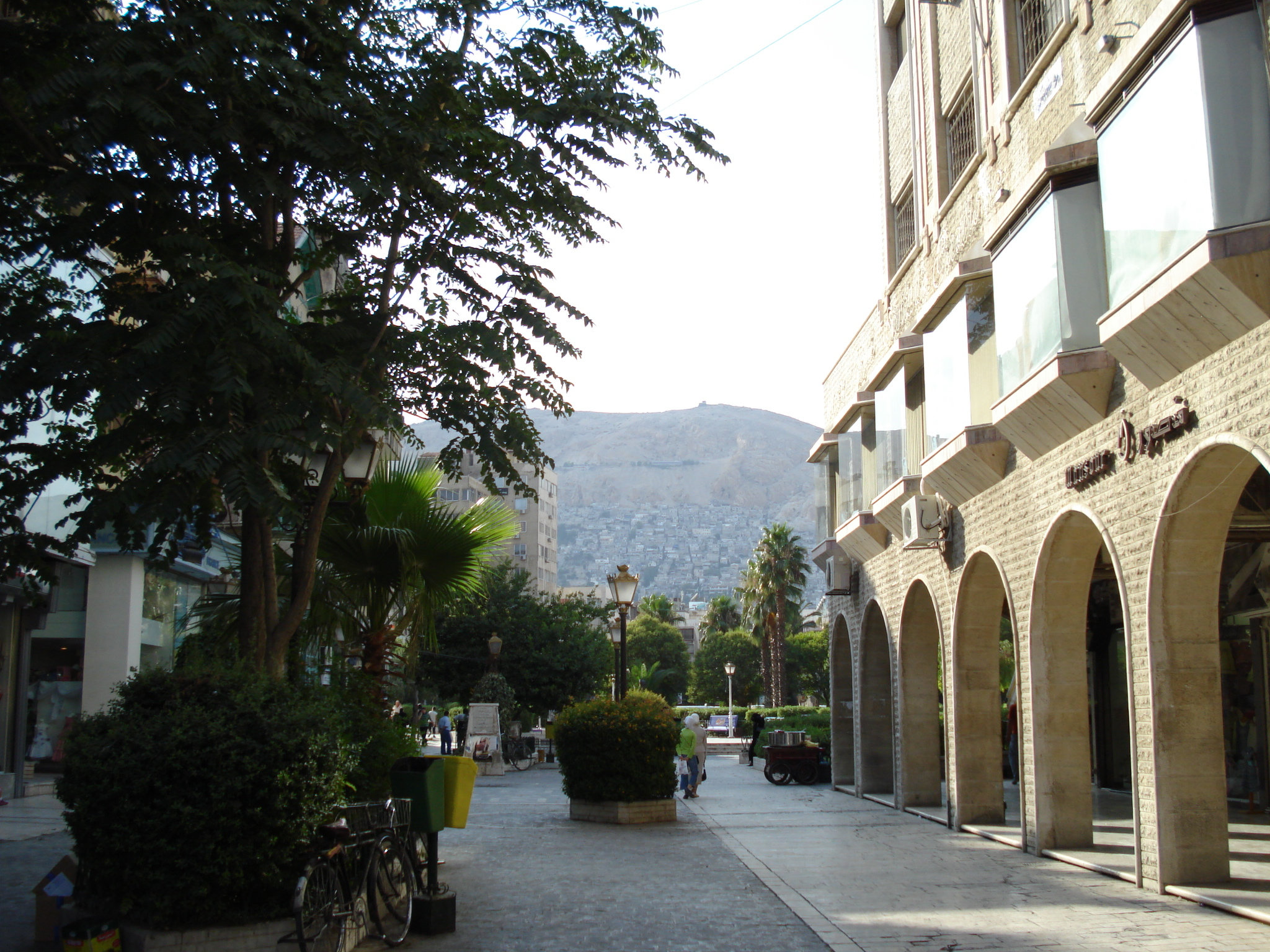
- Al-Salihiyah quarter in 2007

- Al-Salihiya on the district map of Damascus
- Coordinates: 33°31′45″N 36°17′15″E
- Country: Syria
- Governorate: Damascus Governorate
- City: Damascus

Population (2004)
  - Total: 72,303
- Time zone: UTC+3 (EET)
  - Summer (DST): UTC+2 (EEST)
- Climate: BSk

Al-Salihiyah (Arabic: الصَّالِحِيَّة, romanized: aṣ-Ṣāliḥiyya) is a municipality and neighborhood of Damascus, Syria. It lies to the northwest of the old walled city of Damascus and about 2.4 kilometres (1.5 mi) southeast of the Citadel, at the foot of Mount Qasioun. Further to the south, it also houses the Syrian Parliament building.

== Neighborhoods ==
- Abu Jarash (pop. 12,798)
- Al-Madaris (pop. 12,731)
- Al-Mazra'a (pop. 6,818)
- Qasyoun (pop. 22,017)
- Shaykh Muhyi ad-Din (pop. 11,502)
- Ash-Shuhada (pop. 6,437)
