= Al-Asali =

Al-Asali العسالي
- Neighborhood
- Location in Syria
- Coordinates: 33°27′59″N 36°17′9″E
- Country: Syria
- Governorate: Damascus Governorate
- Subdistrict: Damascus
- Municipality: Qadam

Population (2004)
  - Total: 21,731
- Time zone: UTC+3 (EET)
  - Summer (DST): UTC+2 (EEST)
- Climate: BSk

Al-Asali (Arabic: العسالي) is a neighborhood and district of the Qadam municipality in Damascus, Syria. It had a population of 21,731 in the 2004 census. The neighborhood was built around the small al-Asali maqam (shrine), named after Shaykh Ahmad al-Asali al-Khalwati, a local Muslim holy man. The al-Asali shrine was a station in the annual Hajj pilgrim caravan, which came to an end in the early 20th century. During the caravan procession, tents were set up around the shrine to host dignitaries and pilgrims before the caravan departed the city for Mecca.
