= Al-Amarah, Syria =

Al-Amara (Arabic: العمارة, romanized: al-‘Amārah), also known as al-Amarah Juwaniyyah (Arabic: العمارة الجوانية, romanized: al-‘Amārah al-Juwwānīyah), is a prominent neighborhood in the old city of Damascus located a few meters away from The Grand Mosque of Damascus.

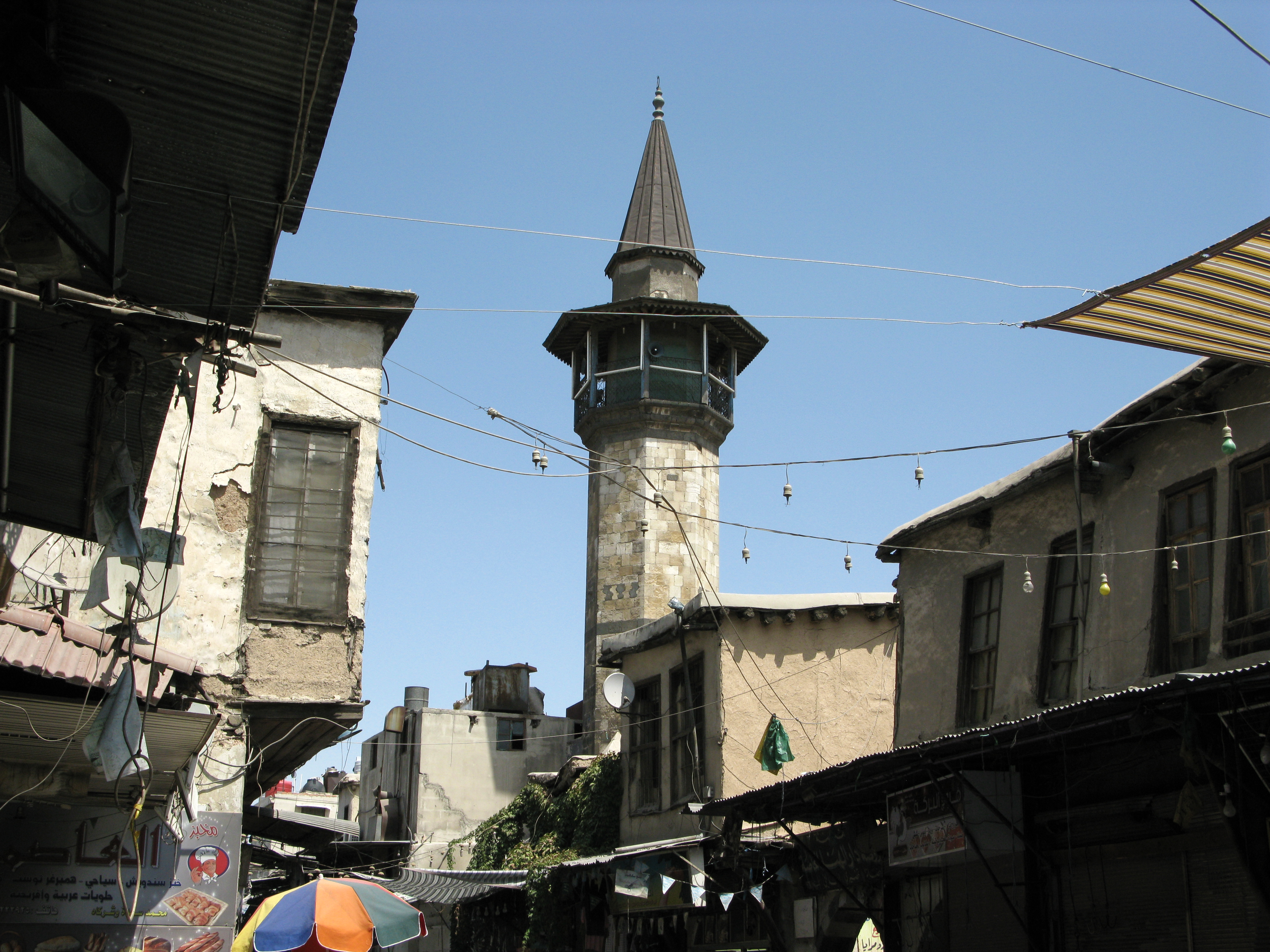
Amara District in The old City of Damascus

== History ==
Damascus prides itself on being the oldest continuously inhabited city in the world. The history of Damascus goes back well into 8000 BC. In every corner of its ancient alleys there's a taste of every historical era there was to be found. Amara District is one of the oldest neighborhoods in the city.

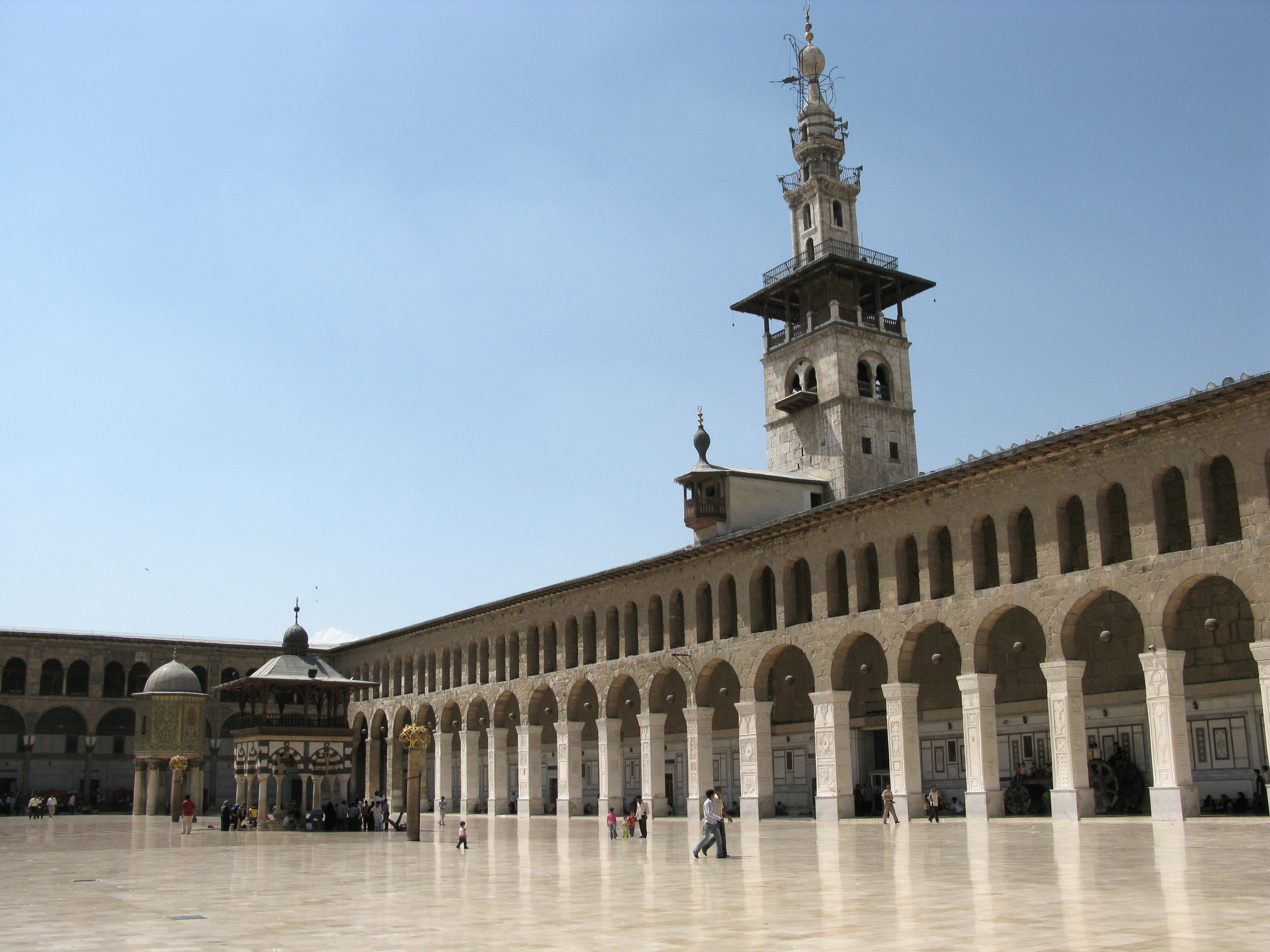
Minarets of The Umayyad Mosque can be spotted almost from every house in the district

Its name derives from the Arabic word “Amara” which means building, denoting its routes which date back to the founding of Damascus. The Great Mosque of Damascus with its stunning minarets can be spotted almost from every house in the district and the souks of the old city can be reached within minutes.

== Description ==
As soon as you dive into the old town from any of the entrances from the modern city, you dive into a maze of alleys, a labyrinth of small streets with arches, with shops, with mosques and churches, with arches and remnants of the old defensive wall, with restaurants hidden behind small doors. From every corner, the age of the houses dawns on you. It is actually quite easy to imagine that life might not even have been very different here many centuries ago.

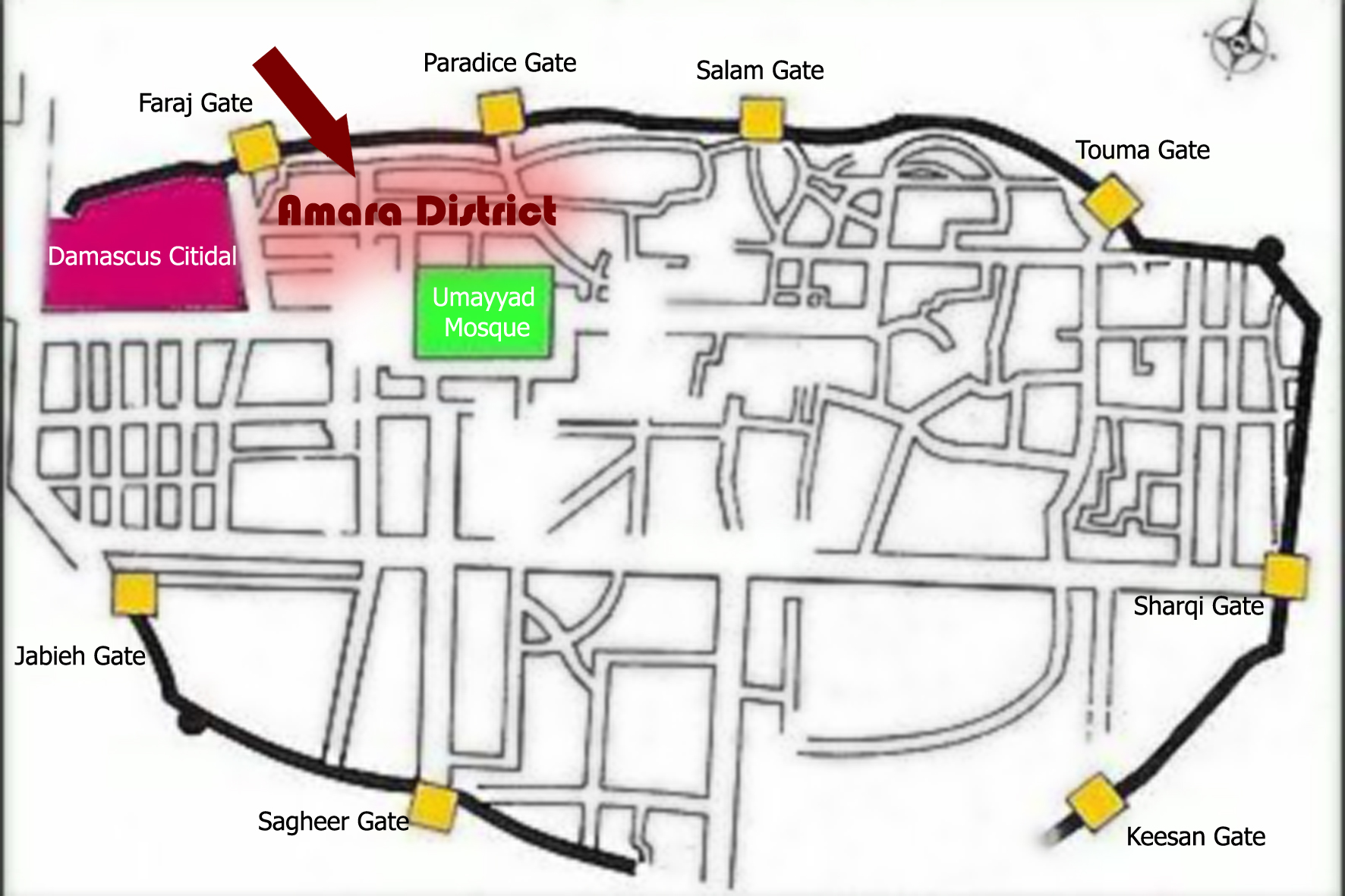
A map of old Damascus showing the district

Sometimes alleys are so tight that you can just walk inside without touching the walls. Some alleys are covered by vines, giving them a distinctly village-like appearance. Despite all the winding little streets, the many side streets and small squares, it is somehow impossible to get lost there - sooner or later you find yourself near one of the landmarks. Stepping back into modern-day Damascus with its traffic is like stepping forward into history.

== Damascene Houses ==
As you stroll through the enchanting neighborhood only simple wooden doors separate you from numerous houses that resemble Arabian palaces with their fabulous facades and roomy entrances. What distinguish these houses from others is more than one thing, the paintings which decorate the walls of these houses are the first thing which make them museums or galleries. Damascene houses in Amara District which are typical of oriental architecture mirrors the social requirements, copes with Islamic traditions, and releases on the raw materials that are found in the Ghouta "farms and gardens that were surrounding Damascus" and overlooking the mountains.

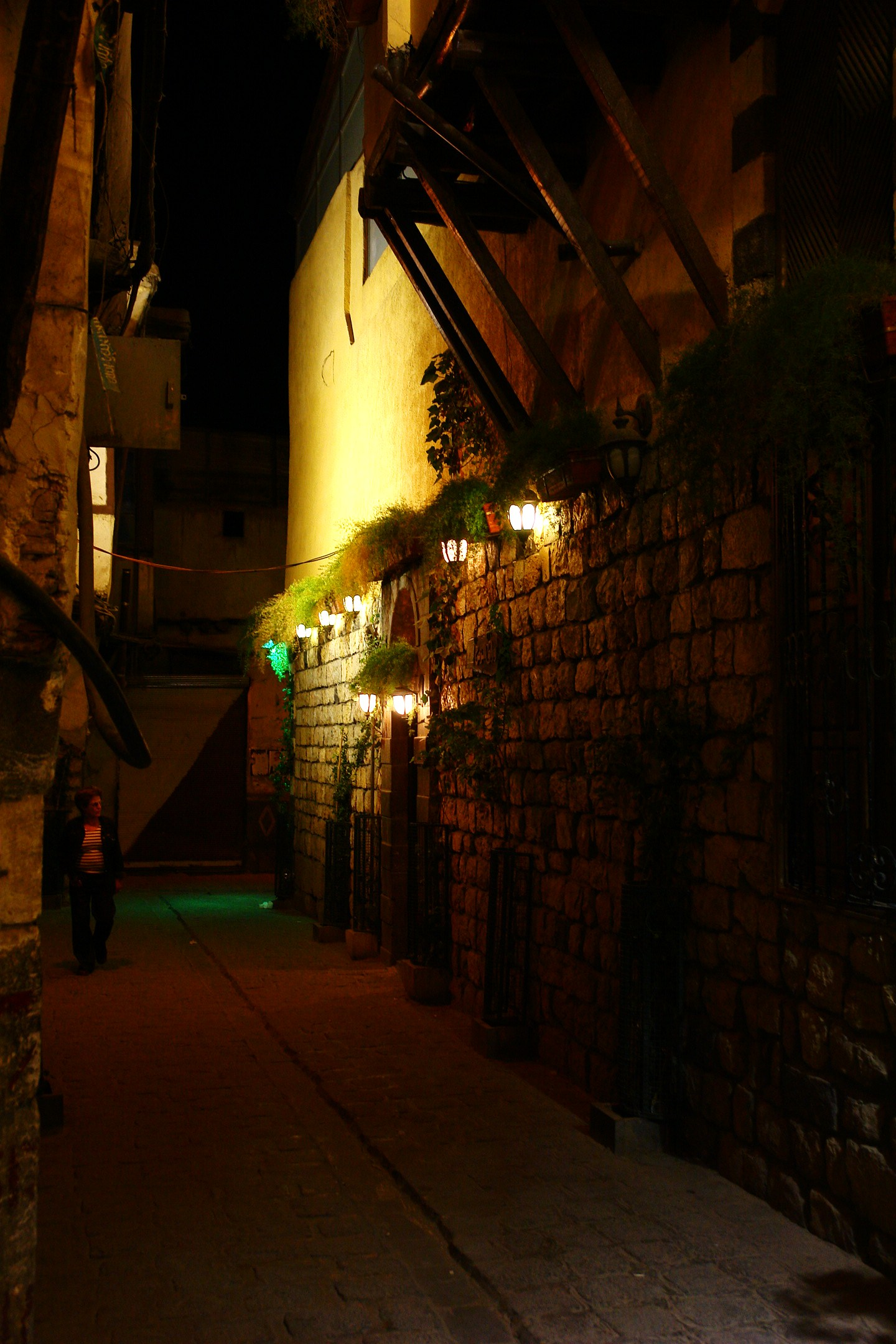

Those houses look solid and sealed off from the outside, but inside all rooms look on spacious open courtyards with trees planted here and there and a water basin in the center. The rooms are large and comfortable. More often there is a second floor over the ground floor, having windows that open to the marrow streets. A quite family life is enjoyed here amidst lovely ornaments created of gypsum, the hard earth, wood or marble made even more beautiful by inscriptions of Islamic calligraphy or a symphony of color and carved wood which decorate the walls and ceilings. On the walls there are shelves where books or utensils, pots and cups are stored in a manner meant to be decorative.

== Family life ==
The inhabitants used to be three generation family, their neighbors where most often kinsmen and friends, the alleys are separated by larger gates which open to markets, mosques, bath houses or fountains and schools. In some cases, the second floor of one house protruded over part of the street, and these come so close together that the alley might look like a tunnel.

== Sayyidah Ruqayya Shrine ==
Located nearby is Sayyidah Ruqayya Shrine which contains the grave of Sukayna, the infant daughter of Husayn ibn ‘Alī. The site was built around the mausoleum in 1985 and exhibits the modern style of Iranian architecture, with a tremendous amount of mirror and gold work. There is a small mosque area adjoining the shrine room, along with a small courtyard in front.

== Al-Zahiriyah Library ==
Built by Sultan Baibars in 1277, the Al-Zahiriyah Library was recognized as the national library of Greater Syria for centuries. The decorations, carvings, and writing on the building walls, in addition to the gate which bears geometric designs and patterns, make the library one of the most important historical sites in Damascus.

The library was nationally recognized by the Syrian state in 1880, and in 1949 a legal deposit law decreed that two copies of every work published in Syria be deposited in al-Zahiriyah National Library. Later in July 1983, Al-Assad Library replaced Al-Zahiriyah Library as the national library of Syria.

== The People of The District ==
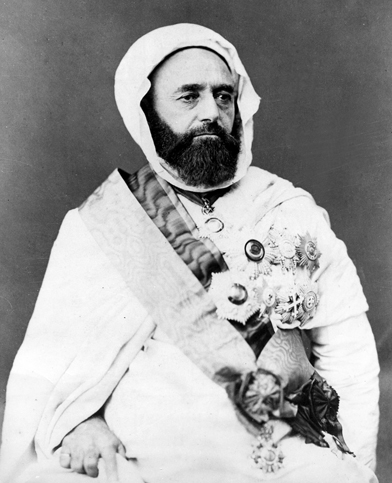
Prince Abd al-Qadir al-Jaza'iri lived in Amara District in exile

The neighborhood has been for centuries home to numerous great personalities and saw the birth, rise and fall of multiple opinion leaders in the region. Among people who have lived in it are Prince Abd al-Qadir al-Jaza'iri, Izzat Husrieh, Sheikh Ramadan Deeb, and Kamar Keilani.

== New Plans ==
Plans to destroy decades old shops in the ancient district caused public outrage in early 2008. The plan aimed at tearing down part of the ancient neighborhood of Al-Amara in order to widen the roads outside the walls of the old city. Efforts of the civil society however, succeeded in reverting the disastrous plans in al-Amara.
