= Bab al-Salam =

Coordinates: 33°30′51″N 36°18′37″E

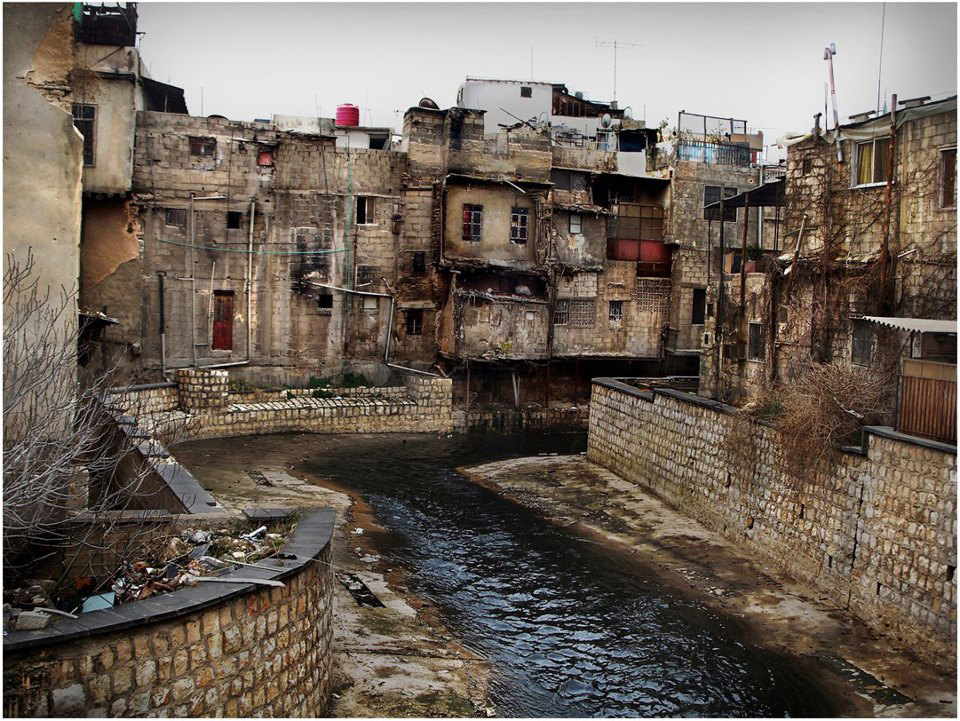
Barada River in the Bab al-Salam neighborhood of Old Damascus.

Bab al-Salam (Arabic: بَابُ السَّلَامِ, romanized: Bāb as-Salām) (The Gate of Peace) is one of the seven ancient city-gates of Damascus, Syria. During the Roman era, it was also known as "Gate of the Moon".
