= Rail transport in Syria =

Syria
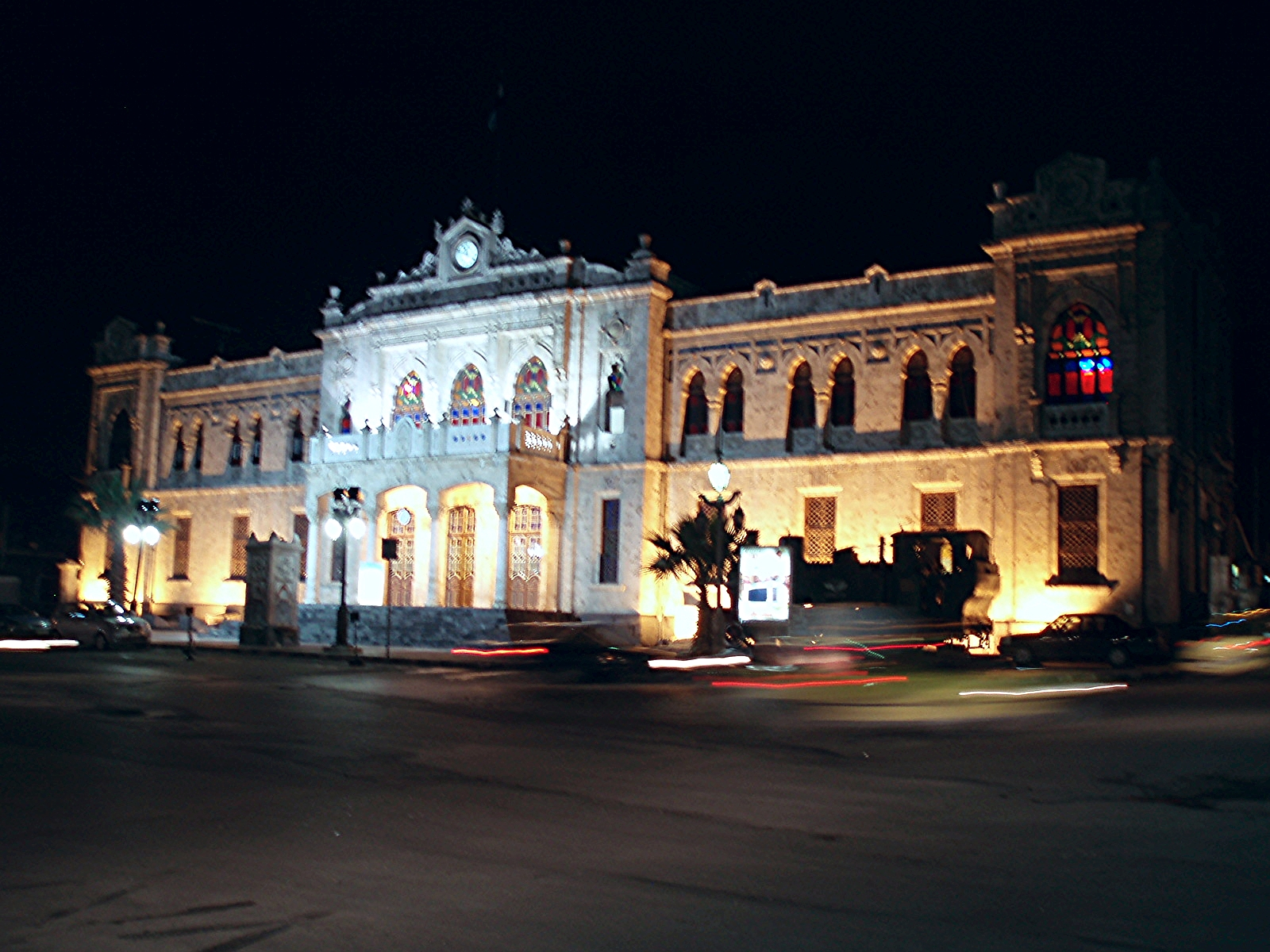
- Hejaz railway station in Damascus.

Operation
- National railway: Syrian Railways
- Major operators: Syrian Railways

System length
- Total: 2,750 km (1,710 mi)

Track gauge
- Main: 1,435 mm (4 ft 8 1/2 in) standard gauge 1,050 mm (3 ft 5 11/32 in) (narrow gauge)

Features
Map
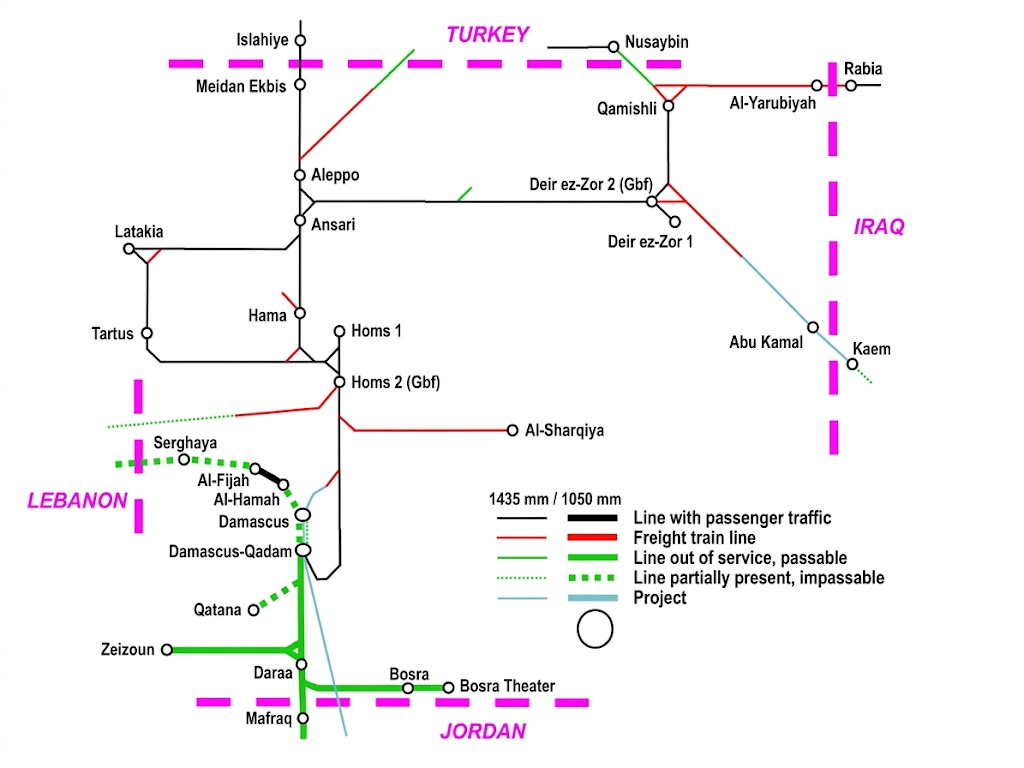

Syria's railway system has been paralyzed since mid-2012, with much of its infrastructure destroyed during the civil war, resulting in a complete suspension of rail services from July 2012 until August 2020.

In August 2025, test operations resumed on the railway line between Aleppo and Hama, marking the first train movements on this route since its paralysis. As of October 2025, 1,052 km (654 mi) of the 2,750 km (1,710 mi) network is currently operational.

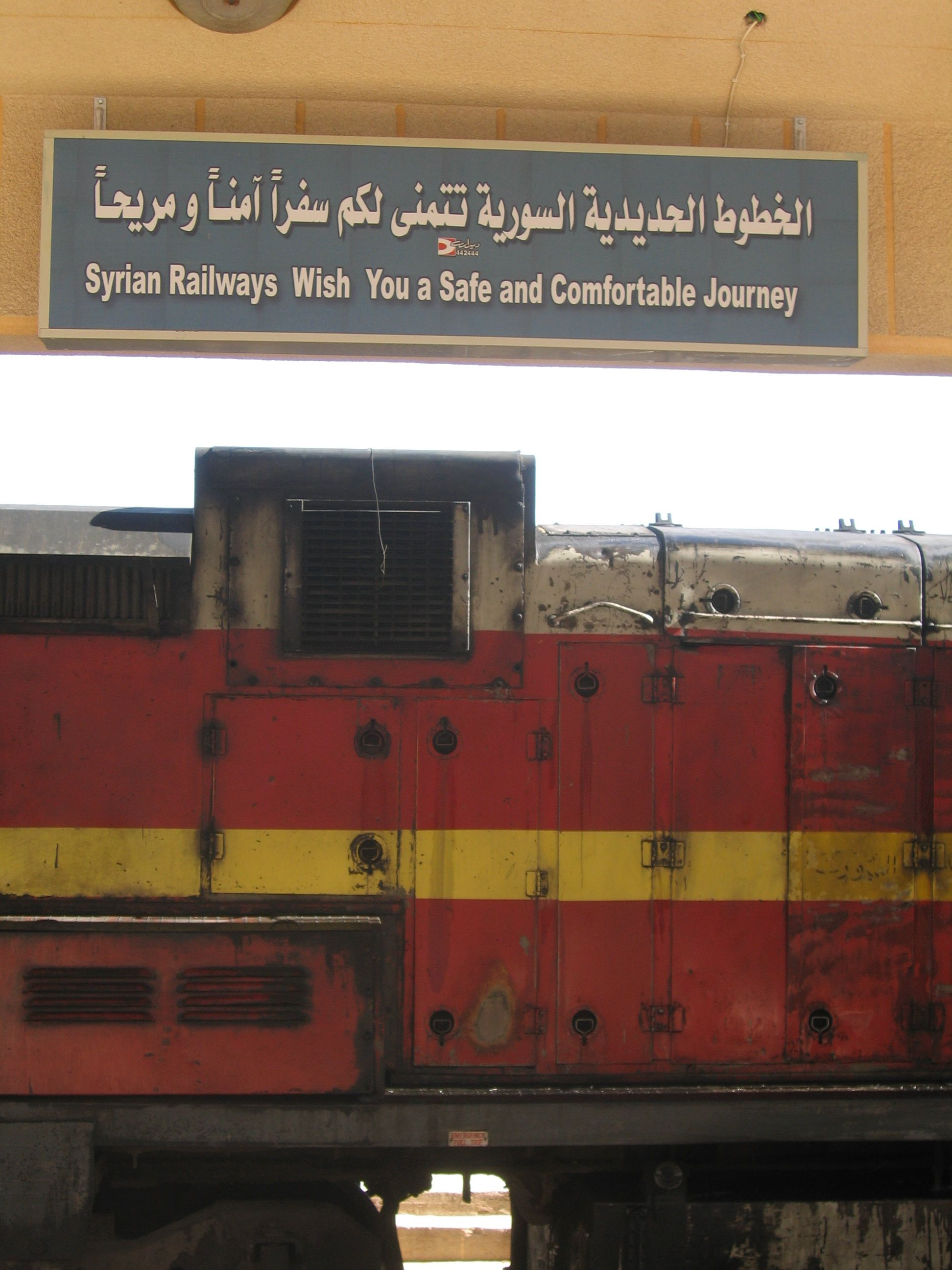
Welcome sign at Qamishli railway station, 2007

Syria is a member of the International Union of Railways (UIC). The UIC Country Code for Syria is 97.

== Current system ==
=== Network ===
All standard-gauge (1,435 mm (4 ft 8 1/2 in)) railway lines in Syria are operated by Syrian Railways, using exclusively diesel-electric traction. Prior to the outbreak of the Syrian civil war, the principal routes included:

- Damascus–Amman railway;
- Adana–Aleppo railway;
- Damascus–Homs–Hama–Aleppo–Meidan Ekbis, with onward connection to the Turkish network of Turkish State Railways toward Ankara;
- Aleppo–Latakia–Tartus–Akkari–Homs;
- Homs–Palmyra, a freight-only line opened in 1980, primarily used for transporting phosphates to the port of Tartus;
- Aleppo–Deir ez-Zor–Qamishli, opened in 1976, with a connection to Nusaybin on the Turkish network;
- Homs–Damascus (194 km), opened in 1983;
- Tartus–Latakia (80 km), opened in 1992;
- A north-west corridor linking the oilfields near Qamishli to the port of Latakia (approximately 750 kilometres (470 mi));
- Qamishli–Al-Yaarubiyah, formerly connecting to Iraqi railway network (out of service)
- Akkari–Tripoli, formerly connecting to the Lebanese network of Chemins de fer de l'État Libanais (CEL) closed between the 1970s and 1990s.

In addition, several lines were under construction prior to 2011:

- Damascus–Sheikh Miskin–Daraa, intended to replace part of the historic Hejaz railway;
- Sheikh Miskin–Suwayda.

==== Trackage ====
These were the figures prior 2011:

- Total: 2,750 km (1,710 mi)
- Standard gauge: 2,423 km (1,506 mi) 1,435 mm (4 ft 8 1/2 in) gauge
- Narrow gauge: 327 km (203 mi) 1,050 mm (3 ft 5 11/32 in) gauge (2000) (Hejaz railway)

==== Extension proposals ====
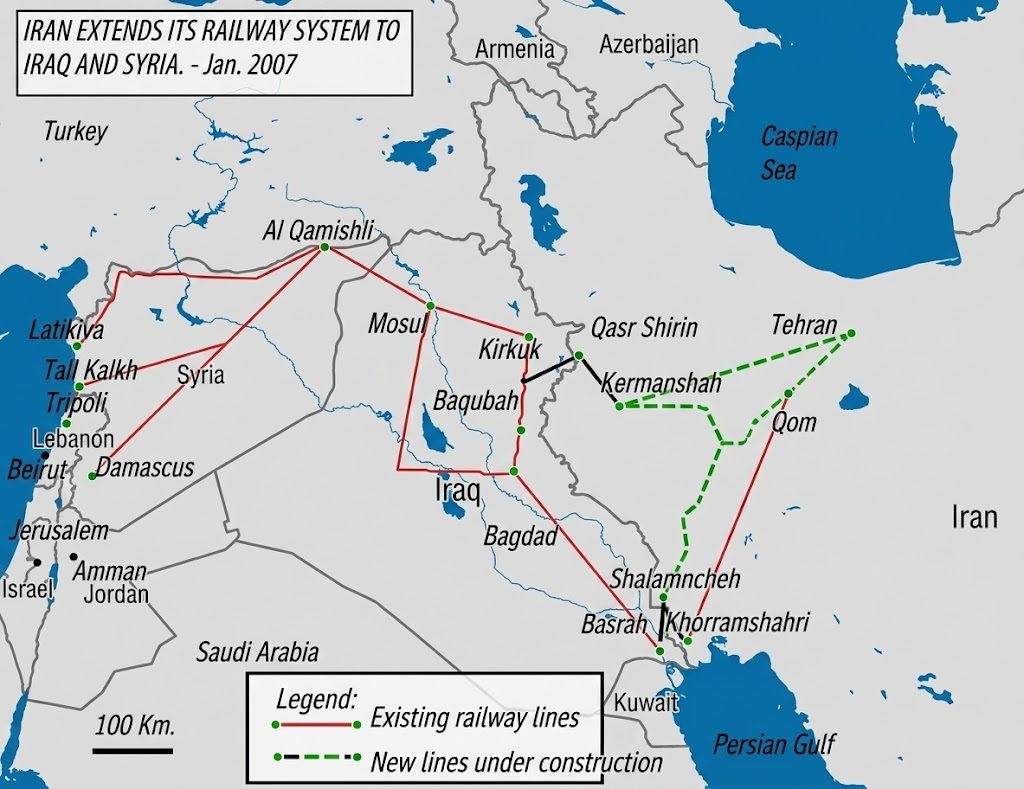
Map of the railway networks in Syria, Iraq and Iran.

Prior to the civil war there was a proposal for a connection with Iraq between Deir ez-Zor and Al Qa'im. The abutments of bridges were built for double track but only the western trackbed was completed. The major Euphrates bridge, a steel girder construction, was completed to the southern border of Syria by 2015, just 3 km from Al Qa'im but Iraqi Republic Railways did not complete the link. Three spans of the Euphrates bridge were destroyed as well as two sections of the approach viaducts during the last decade of warfare. The trackbed near the bridge shows bomb craters since Google Earth imagery dated 2017. Tracklaying never reached the Euphrates bridge. However, all international routes operated by Syrian Railways were already non-operational due to severe negligence by the Syrian government. It was then officially suspended due to the outbreak of the Syrian revolution.

The restoration of the rail link with Iraq and the proposal to extend the railway from Al-Qa'im in Iraq through Abu Kamal in Syria to Homs for a total distance of 270 kilometers and thence to Tartus are as of 2022 under discussion.

=== Operations ===
The network is designed wholly around diesel-electric traction, similar to those of neighbouring countries such as Jordan and Iraq.

The system has a low level capacity, with top speed usually limited. A 30 km (19 mi) section of the Damascus–Aleppo line was designed for speeds reaching 120 km/h (75 mph), but most of the track has a limit of 110 km/h (68 mph). Most tracks of Syrian Railways are limited to 80 km/h (50 mph). Operational train speed is also limited by a lack of interlocked signalling, with most of the system operating by informal signalling. The Damascus al-Hijaz railway station, which lies in the city centre, is no longer operational, and the railway connections with other cities depart from the suburban station of Qadam.

The result is that most passenger traffic has moved to air-conditioned coaches, and freight traffic dominates the operational trackage. The 2005 introduction of South Korean-built DMUs, where drivers were trained using a simulator, on the Damascus–Aleppo route, and the high traffic Aleppo–Latakia route where intermediate stations are bypassed, resulted in higher usage and occupancy levels.

The only remaining section of narrow-gauge line, running from a point on the outskirts of Damascus into Jordan, is operated by Hedjaz Jordan Railway.

=== International connections ===
The only international connection was with Turkey, but that link was halted due to the Syrian civil war. The link with Iraq, severed in the 2003 US-led invasion, was restored for a time but closed again; there was a plan to reopen it in June 2009. In 2008 it was proposed to open a joint rolling stock factory with Turkish State Railways at Aleppo.

==== Taurus Express ====
The Taurus Express was inaugurated in February 1930 by the Compagnie Internationale des Wagons-Lits, the same company that operated the Orient Express and Simplon Orient Express, as a means of extending their services beyond Istanbul to the East. It ran several times a week from Istanbul Haydarpaşa station to Aleppo and Baghdad, with a weekly through sleeper to Tripoli in Lebanon.

After the World War II, the Wagons-Lits company gradually withdrew and operation of the Taurus Express was taken over by the Turkish, Syrian and Iraqi state railways. Up until the late 1980s, a twice-weekly Istanbul-Baghdad service was maintained, with weekly through seating cars from Istanbul to Aleppo. For political reasons, the through service to Baghdad was suspended and the main train curtailed at Gaziantep, but the weekly through seat cars Istanbul-Aleppo were maintained.

In 2001, the Aleppo portion of the Toros Express was speeded-up and given a proper Syrian sleeping-car instead of the two very basic Turkish seat cars.

== History ==
The first railway in Syria opened when the country was part of the Ottoman Empire, with the 1,050 mm (3 ft 5 11/32 in) gauge line from Damascus to the port city of Beirut in present-day Lebanon opened in 1895. The Hejaz railway opened in 1908 between Damascus and Medina in present-day Saudi Arabia also used 1,050 mm (3 ft 5 11/32 in) gauge. Railways after this point were built to 1,435 mm (4 ft 8 1/2 in) standard gauge, including the Baghdad Railway. The French wanted an extension of the standard gauge railway to connect with Palestine Railways and so agreed the building of a branch line to Tripoli, Lebanon, operated by Société Ottomane du Chemin de fer Damas-Hama et prolongements, also known as DHP.

The Baghdad Railway had progressed as far as Aleppo by 1912, with the branch to Tripoli complete, by the start of World War I; and onwards to Nusaybin by October 1918. The Turks, who sided with Germany and the Central Powers, decided to recover the infrastructure south of Aleppo to the Lebanon in 1917. The Baghdad Railway created opportunity and problems for both sides, being unfinished but running just south of the then-defined Syrian–Turkish border. Post war, the border was redrawn, and the railway was now north of the border. DHP reinstated the Tripoli line by 1921. From 1922 the Baghdad Railway was worked in succession by two French companies, who were liquidated in 1933 when the border was again redrawn, placing the Baghdad Railway section again in Syrian control. Lignes Syriennes de Baghdad (LSB) took over operations, a subsidiary of DHP.

The next big developments in Syrian railways were due to the political manoeuvering leading up to and during World War II. As Turkey had sided with Germany in World War I, the Allies were concerned with poor transport in the area, and their ability to bring force on the Turks. Having built railways extensions in both the Eastern and Western deserts of Egypt, they initially operated services via the Hejaz Railway, but were frustrated by the need to transload goods due to the gauge break. They surveyed a route from Haifa to Rayaq in 1941, but decided there were too many construction difficulties. The standard gauge line from Beirut to Haifa was eventually built by Commonwealth military engineers from South Africa and Oceania during World War II, in part supplied by a 1,050 mm (3 ft 5 11/32 in) gauge railway to access materials. Ultimately, Turkey remained neutral and refused the Allies access to their jointly controlled sections of the Baghdad Railway, although by then the Allies had extended Palestine Railways' line from Beirut along the Lebanese coast, crossing into Syria near Akkari and from there to Homs, Hama and onward to connect with the Baghdad Railway at Aleppo.

Locomotives servicing the Allied war effort included the British Robert Riddles designed WD Austerity 2-10-0, four of which post war went into Syrian service, designed CFS Class 150.6.

In 1956 all railways in Syria were nationalised, and reorganised as CFS (Syrian Railways/Chemins de Fer Syriens) from 1 January 1965. Expanded with monetary and industrial assistance from the Soviet Union, the agreement covered the joint industrial development of the country. Covering the development of the ports of Tartus and Latakia, they were initially connected by rail to Al Akkari and Aleppo in 1968 and 1975 respectively. An irrigation project on the Euphrates, resulting in the construction of the Euphrates Dam, drove the connection of Aleppo to Tabqa (1968), Raqqa (1972) Deir ez-Zor (1973), reaching the old Baghdad Railway at Qamishli in 1976.

=== Syrian civil war ===
The Syrian civil war began in 2011, and by January 2012, the Aleppo–Hama railway line was suspended due to escalating military operations and the expansion of clashes in Syria's central and northern regions. This line played a central role in transporting passengers and goods between the north and south of Syria. The Damascus-Medina line ceased operation in its entirety in the spring of 2011 due to Syrian revolution.

As the conflict intensified, railway infrastructure became a target. In January 2012, a bomb planted on the railway between Mahmabil and Bishmaroun stations in Idlib derailed a train drawing 20 tankers loaded with 1,000 tons of fuel, injuring three workers.

By 2015, the Euphrates bridge, a key steel girder structure, was completed to the southern border of Syria, just 3 km from Al Qa'im. However, Iraqi Railways did not complete the link, and during the subsequent years of warfare, three spans of the bridge and two sections of the approach viaducts were destroyed. The trackbed near the bridge showed bomb craters as of 2017, and tracklaying never reached the Euphrates bridge.

After 2016, while some areas experienced reduced conflict, the railway system remained largely non-operational.

=== Post-war ===
On August 6, 2025, the first test run of a train between Aleppo and Hama took place, marking the first such operation since the line was suspended in 2012 due to the Civil War. The trial journey was conducted by the Train Set Group, following extensive maintenance of both trains and tracks. The train reached speeds of up to 160 km/h and was equipped with air-conditioning and onboard services. Plans are underway to expand the network to other cities, including Homs and Damascus, and eventually connect to Turkey via Gaziantep.

On September 23, 2025 a preliminary agreement was reached between Turkey, Jordan, and Syria about restoring a 30 km (18.6 miles) portion of the Hejaz railway located within Syria. With the Turkish government providing assistance with repairing the superstructure And the Jordanian's providing "technical capabilities for the maintenance, repair, and operation of locomotives in Syria." Additionally the Syrian Arab News Agency stressed the hope that it will be the start of a "joint effort to activate rail connectivity among the three countries."

== Tramway ==
Location	Traction type	Operational	Notes
Aleppo	Electric	1929 – 1967	.
Damascus	Electric	7 February 1907 – 1967	.

== Rolling stock ==
=== Current ===
==== Motive power ====
The motive power in 2009 was noted as:

Class	Image	Axle Formula	Number	Year in Service	Power (kW)	Max. speed (km/h)	Traction Type*	Notes
DMU-5			10	2006	1680	120/160	DH	A diesel multiple unit (DMU) manufactured by South Korean Hyundai Rotem for long-distance services between Aleppo, Damascus, and Latakia. The train has a capacity of 222 second-class and 61 first-class passengers
LDE-650		Bo-Bo	9	1968	478		DE	Shunting locomotives built in France
LDE-1200	LDE 1200–007 in Damaskus Kadam	Co-Co	11	1973	883	100	DE	TEM2 Shunting locomotives built in the Soviet Union, 346 kN tractive effort
LDE-1500	LDE 1500–524 in Tartus	Co-Co	25	1982	1102		DE	Czechoslovakia, similar to ČSD (ČKD) ČSD Class T 669.0
LDE-1800		Co-Co	26	1976	1323		DE	American built General Electric U17C export model. 30 originally built in 2 batches
LDE-2800		Co-Co	77	1982	2058	100	DE	Russian TE114, 110 originally built. Partly modernised by General Electric in 2000 by fitting 12cyclinder GE FDL of 3000 hp
LDE-3200		Co-Co	30	1999	2400	120	DE	French Prima DE 32C AC diesel locomotives, engines by Ruston & Hornsby 3,200 hp (2,400 kW).
unknown								Steam locomotive in Bosra.
* DH = Diesel-hydraulic, DE = Diesel-electric

As of 2025, DMU-5 is in use.

==== Passenger vehicles ====
The railway possessed:

- Passenger carriages: almost all OSJD obtained mainly from the former Deutsche Reichsbahn of East Germany, the newest of which were obtained from Căile Ferate Române of Romania and Polish State Railways;

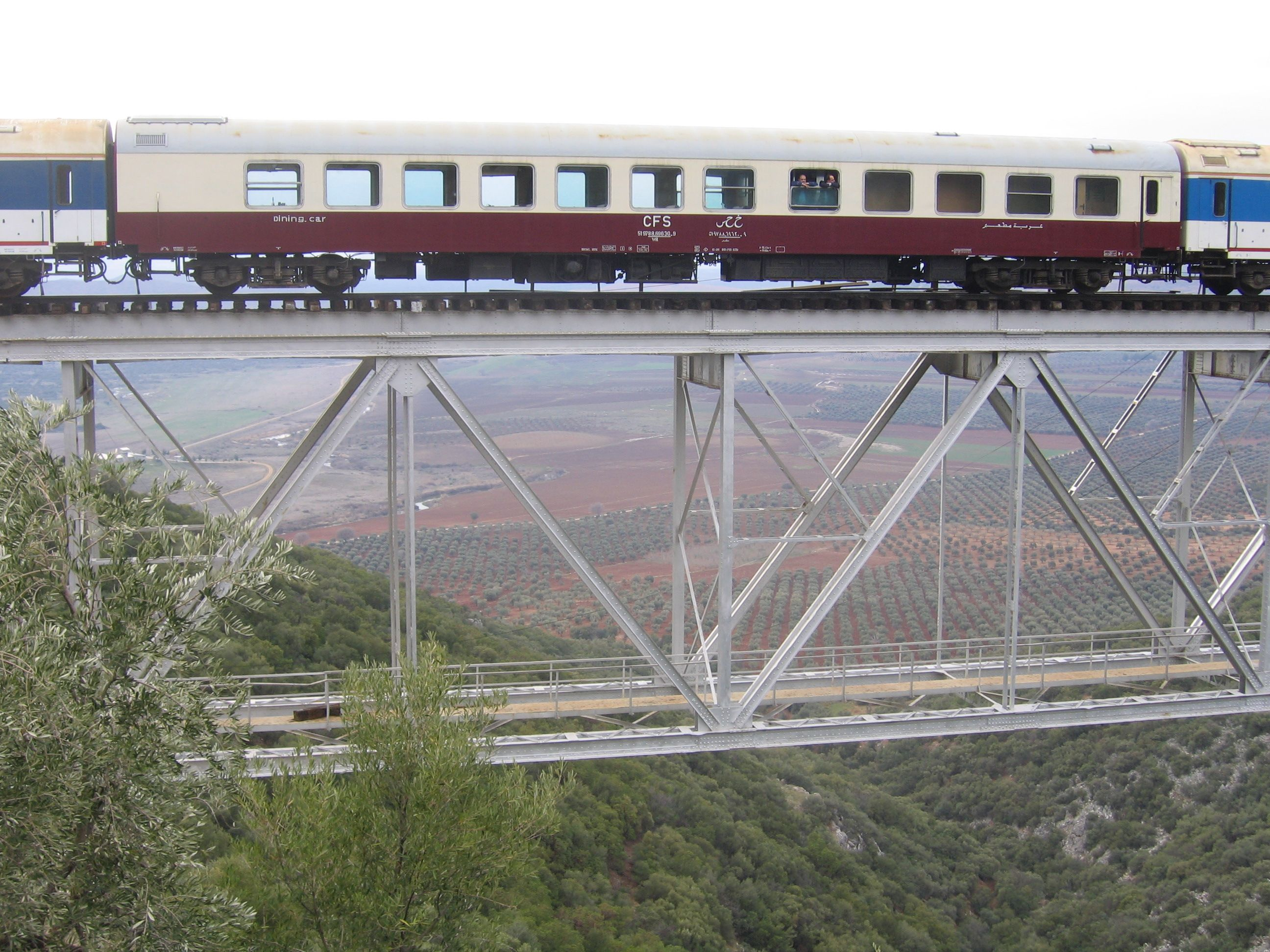
CFS dining car (2007)

- The stock of 483 carriages includes: 19 restaurant, 45 sleepers and 33 baggage vans. In 2001, Iranian company Wagon Pars refurbished some stock which is still in use, while the remaining unused stock lie rotting in sidings.

Class	Image	Number	Year in Service	Notes
Cars for DMU-5		N/A	2006	Built for Aleppo–Latakia line by Hyundai Rotem
Type Y		358	1982–83	Original built for Damascus–Homs-line by VEB Bautzen. Delivered in orange-cream Städteexpress livery

==== Freight wagons ====
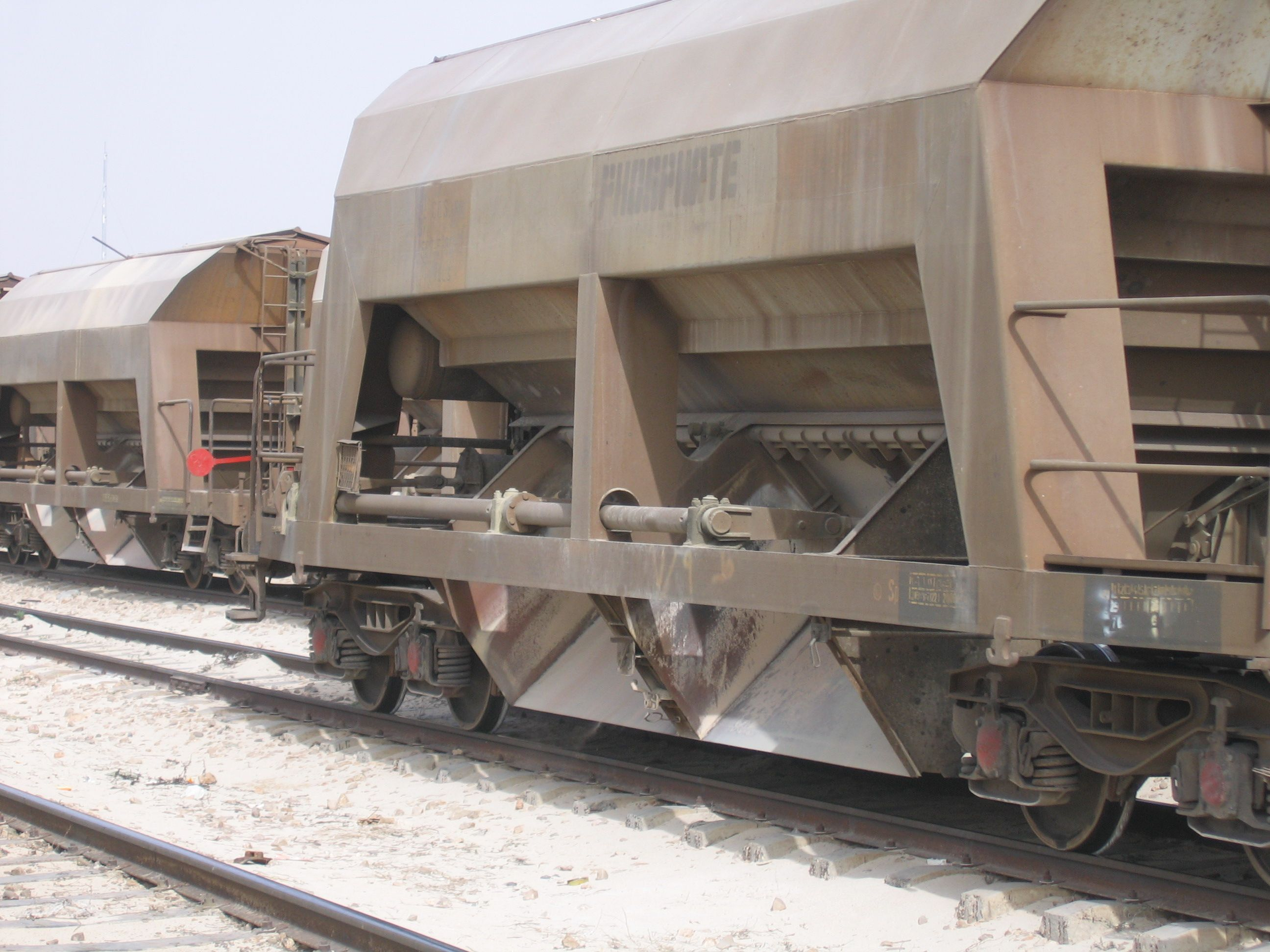
CFS phosphate mineral wagon (2007)

Freight trains in Syria are typically operated as block trains, carrying bulk commodities such as oil, natural gas, phosphates, grain, cement, containers and construction materials.

The fleet comprises approximately 4,319 vehicles, most of which were built between 1960 and 1975. The most modern rolling stock consists of grain wagons imported from Iran in the early 1990s.

Approximate distribution of freight wagons:

- 1,294 heavy flat wagons
- 846 open wagons
- 818 oil tank wagons
- 762 covered wagons
- 597 grain wagons
- 323 phosphate wagons
- 178 sliding-wall wagons
- 146 self-unloading wagons
- 53 flat wagons
- 50 natural gas tank wagons
- 45 cement wagons
- 20 water tank wagons
- 19 tipper wagons

===== Retired =====
Class	Image	Axle Formula	Number	Year in Service	Power [kW]	Max.Speed [km/h]	Notes
De Dion-Bouton		railcar		1930			Built for Hejaz railway.
Ganz/MÁVAG R12		railcar					
SGP AB49000		B'B' Railcar	7	1966	470	100	Length: 26 meters. 20 seats 1st class; 58 seats 2nd class.

== Gallery ==
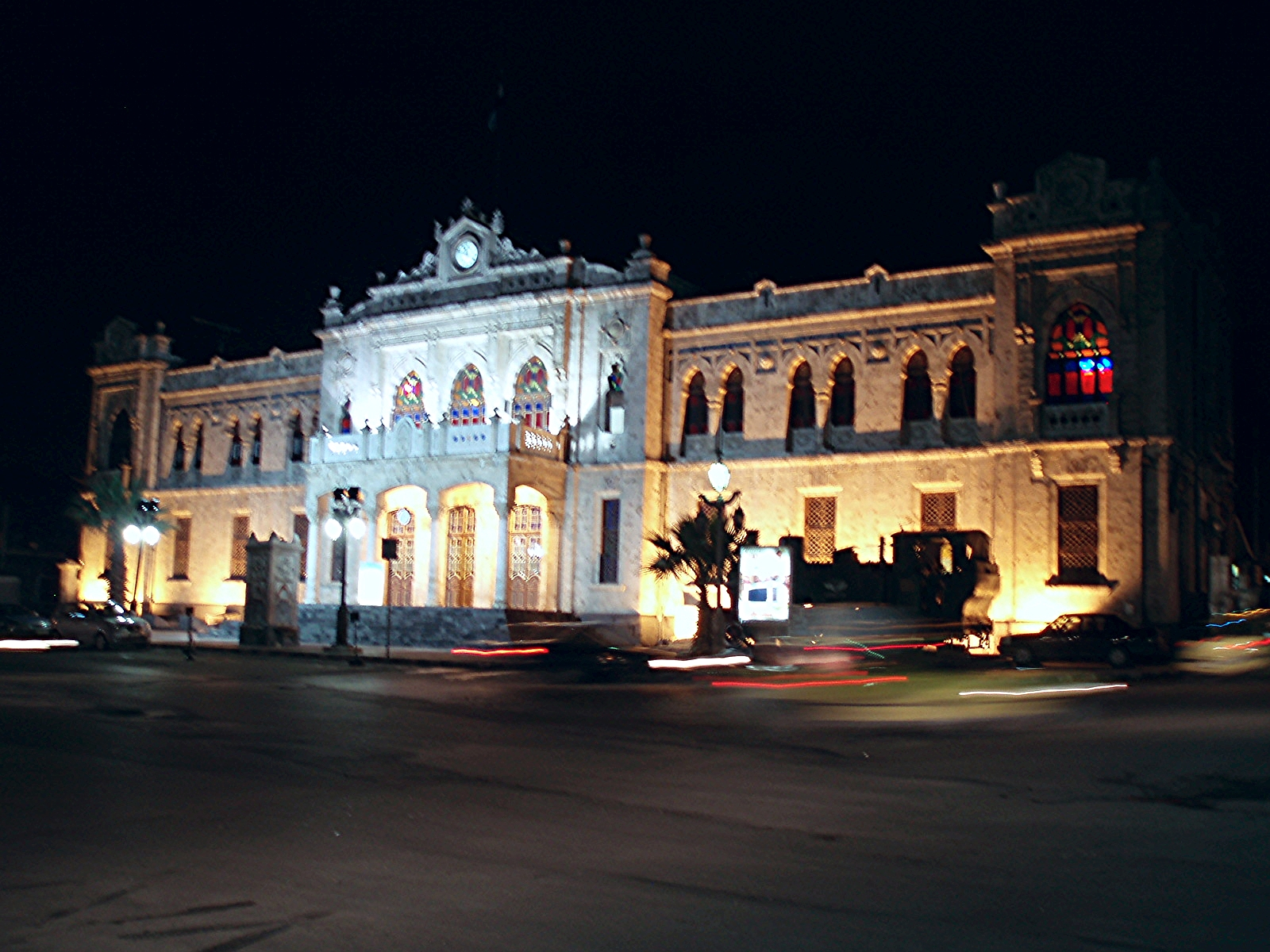
Hejaz railway station, Damascus

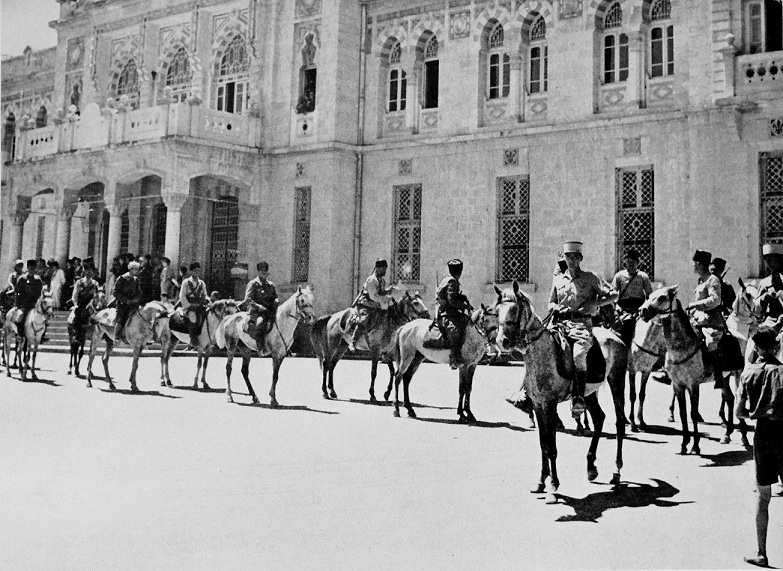
Colonel Philibert Collet's Circassian Cavalry outside the railway station at Damascus, 26 June 1941

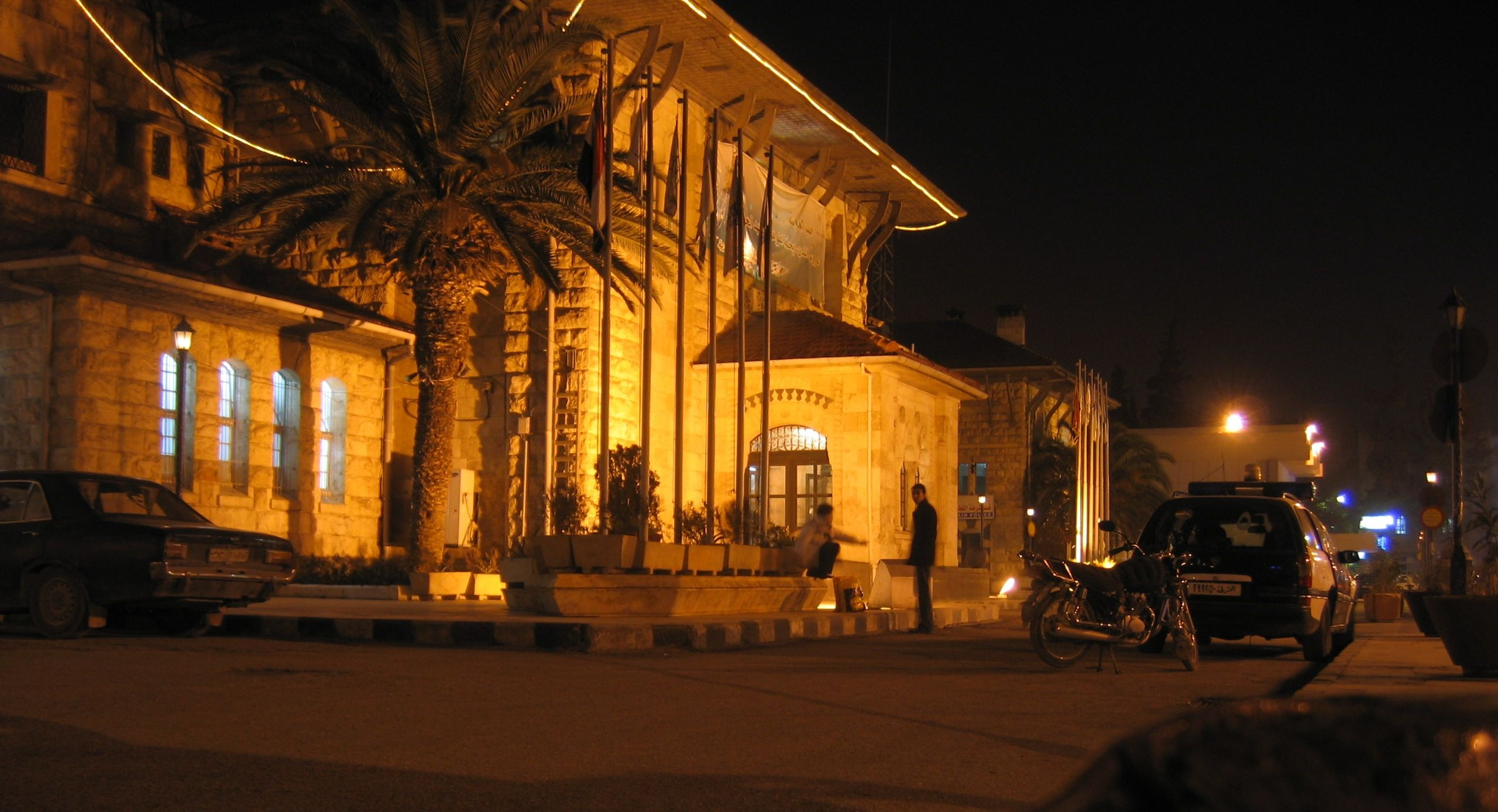
Baghdad railway station in Aleppo, built in 1915

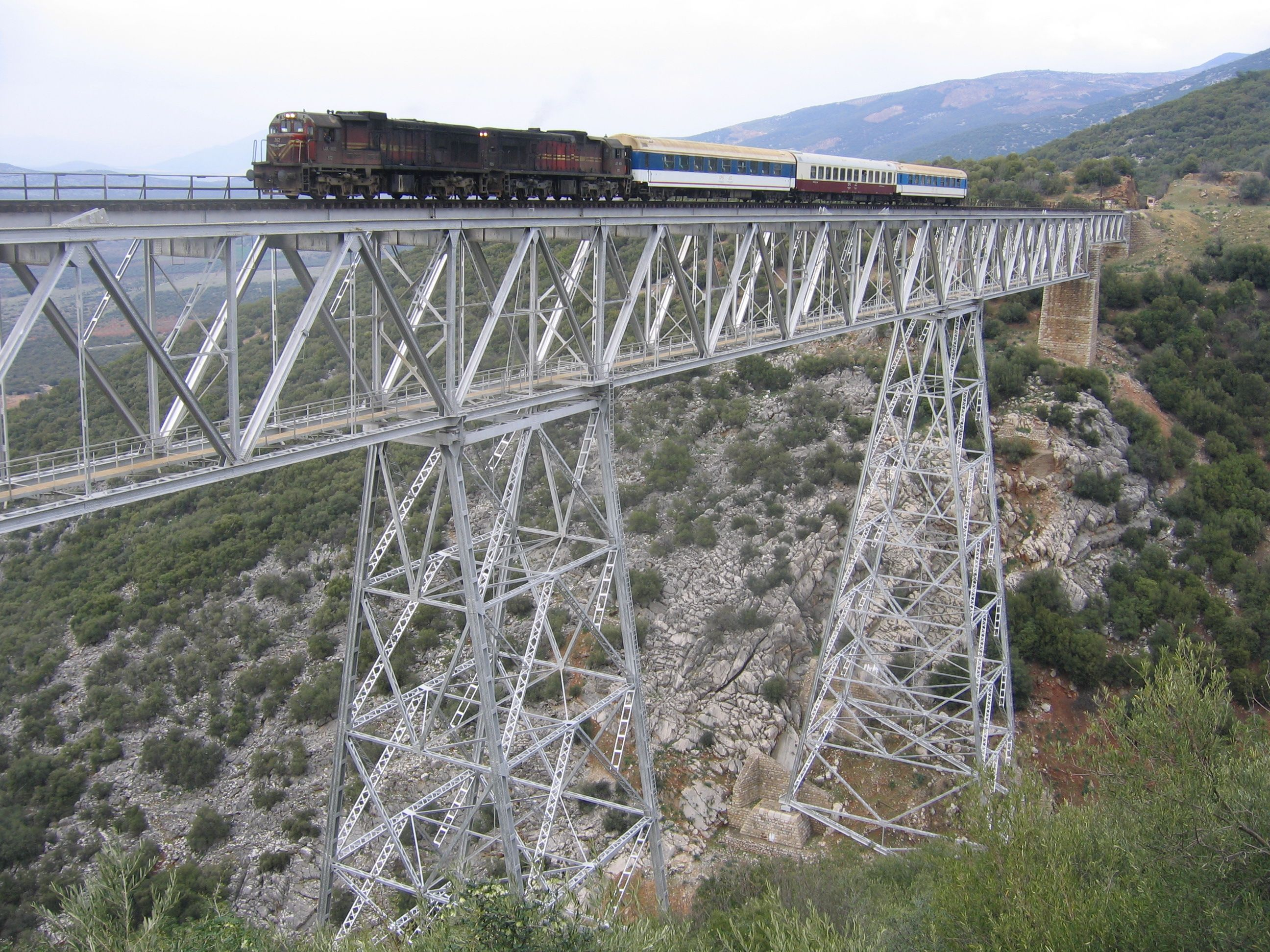
Bridge on the Aleppo-Latakia line

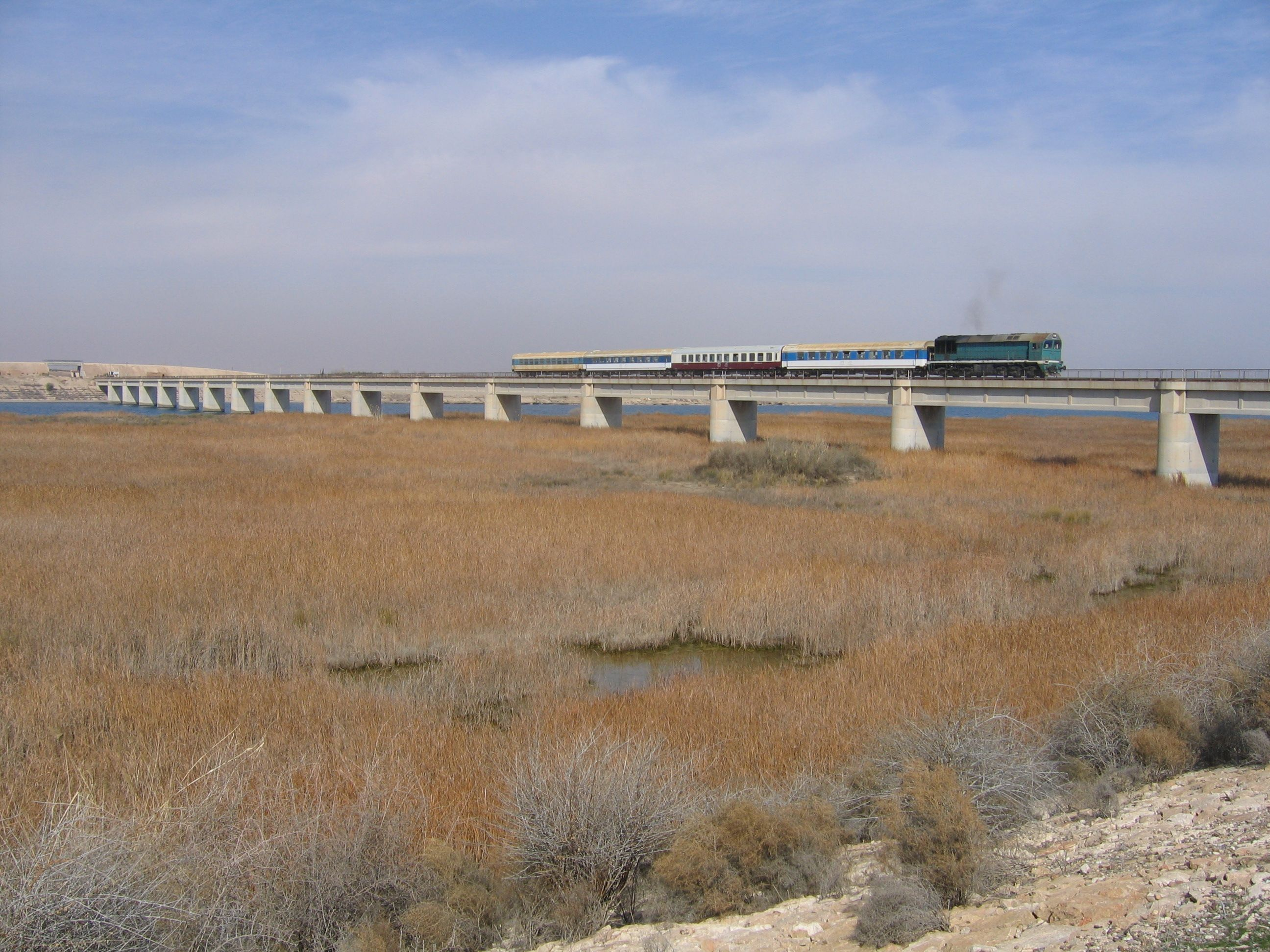
Bridge over the Euphrates river

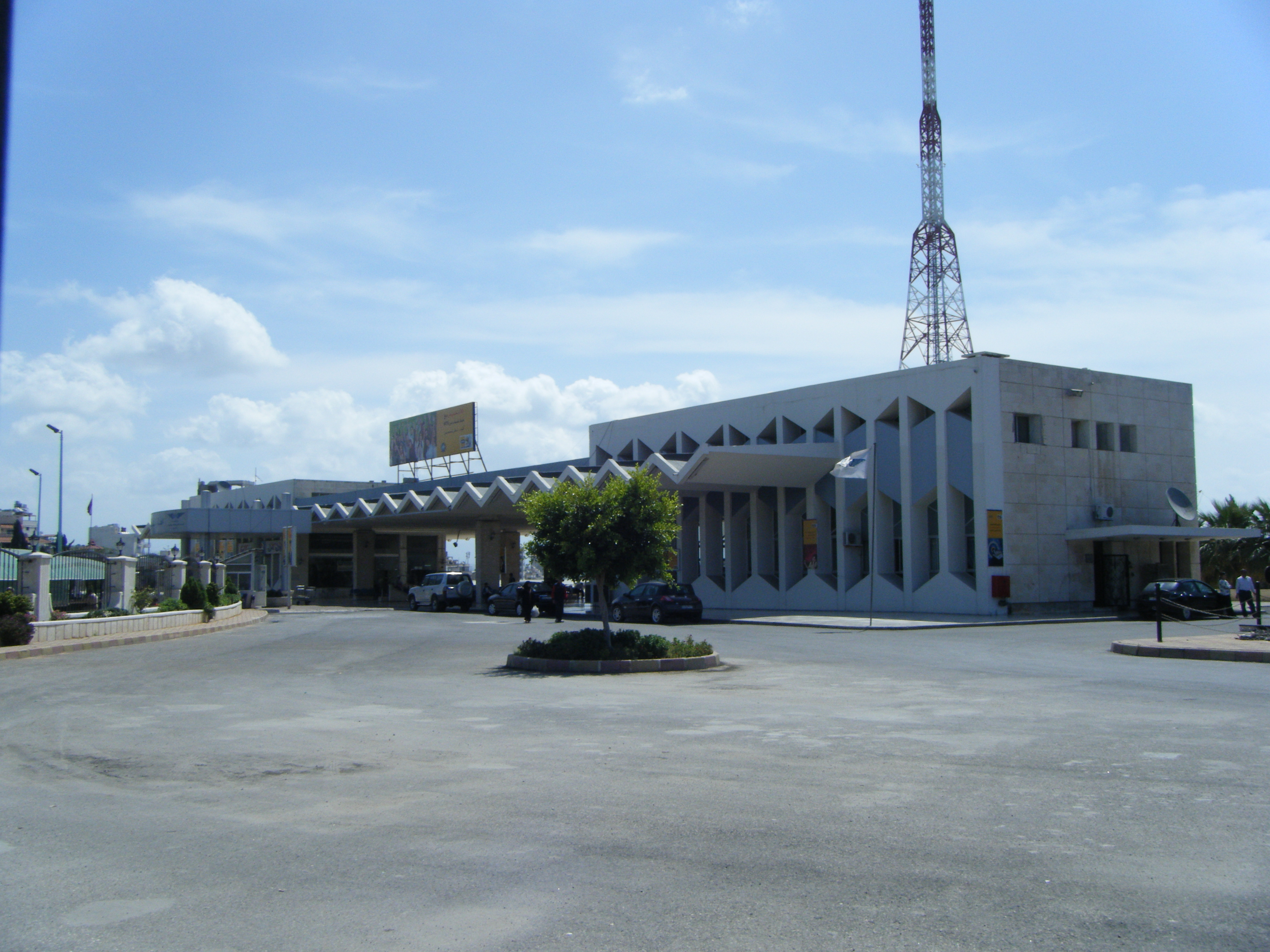
Latakia railway station

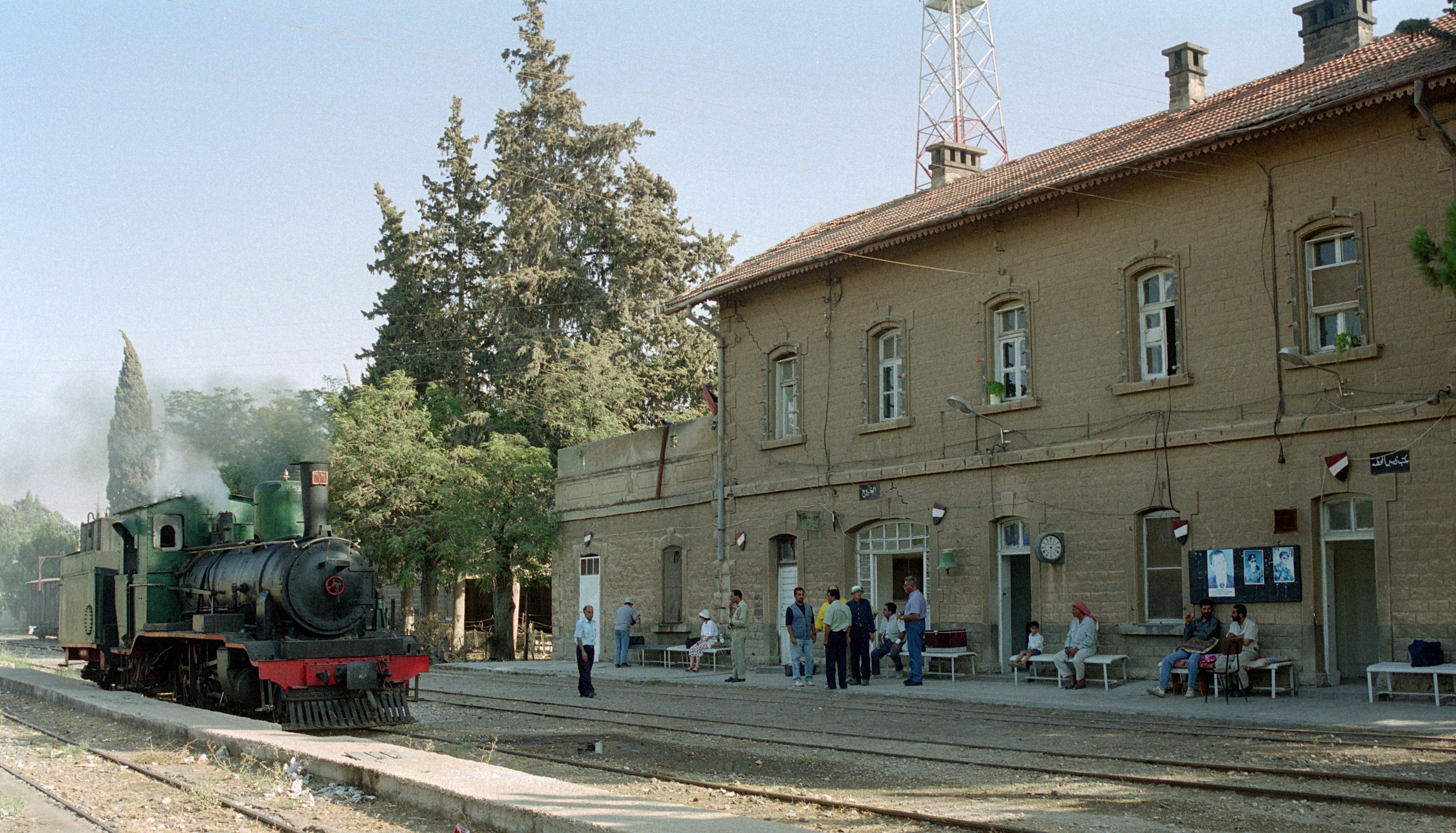
Daraa railway station

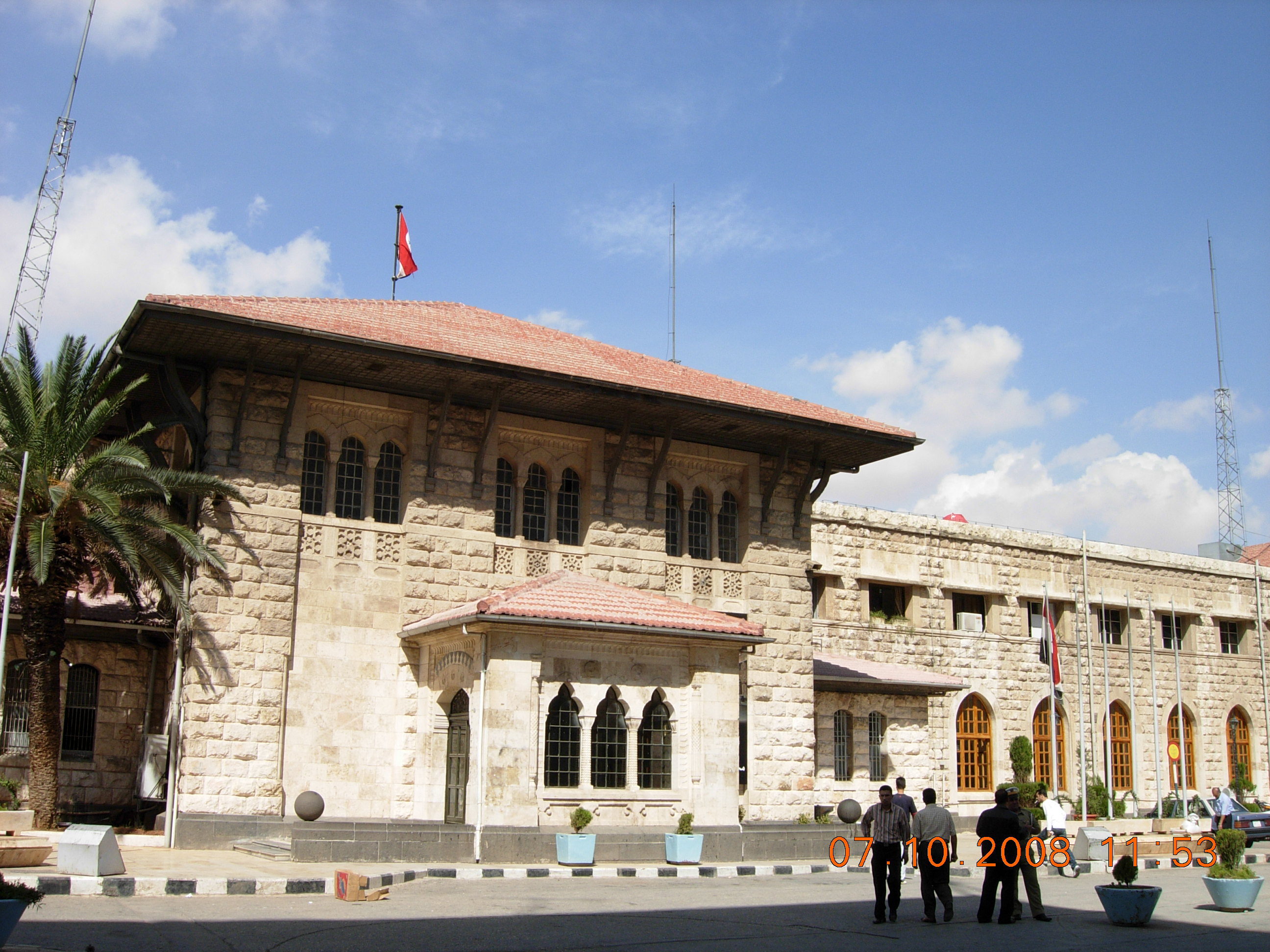
Main train station, Aleppo

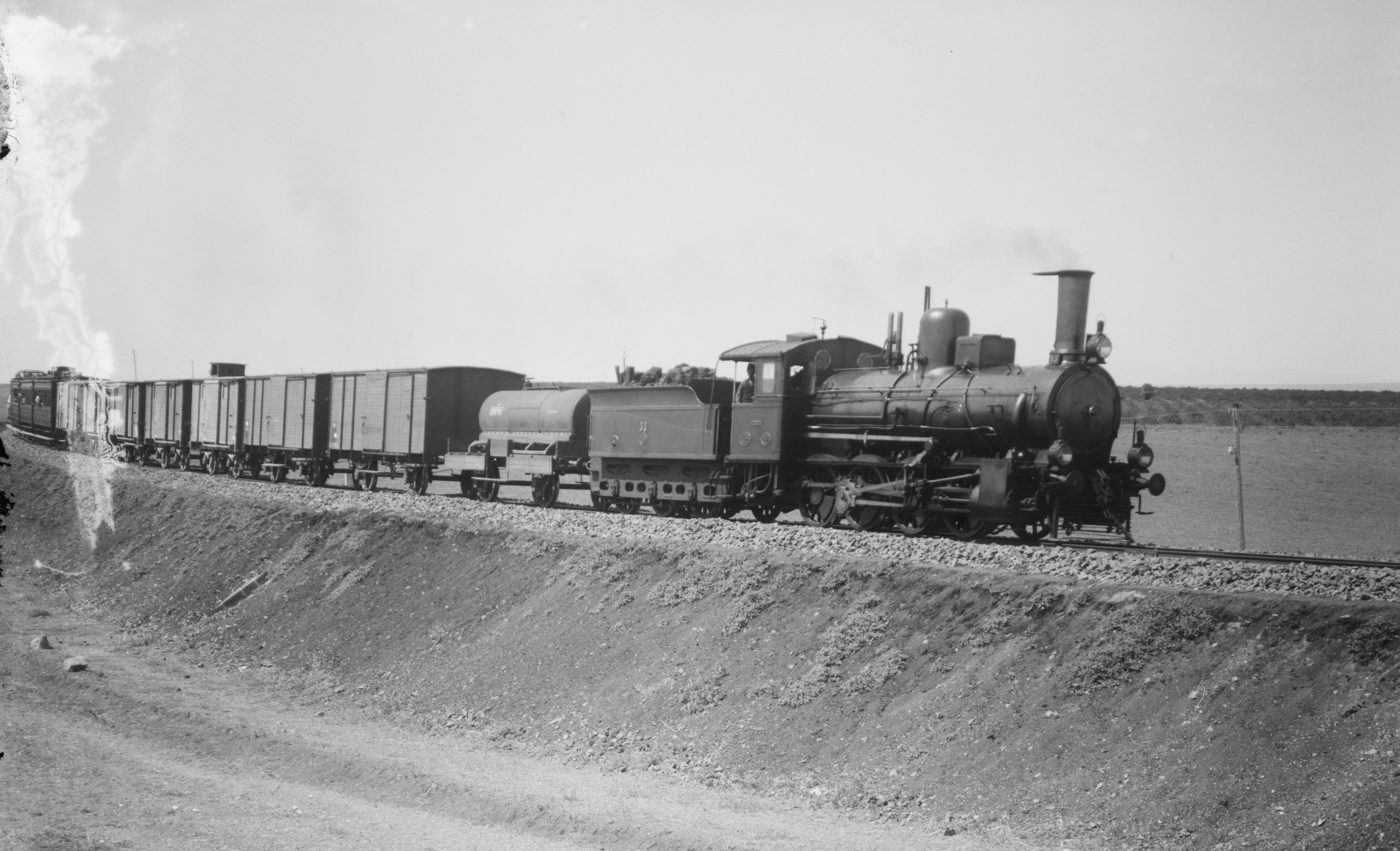
Baghdad Railway train, circa 1910

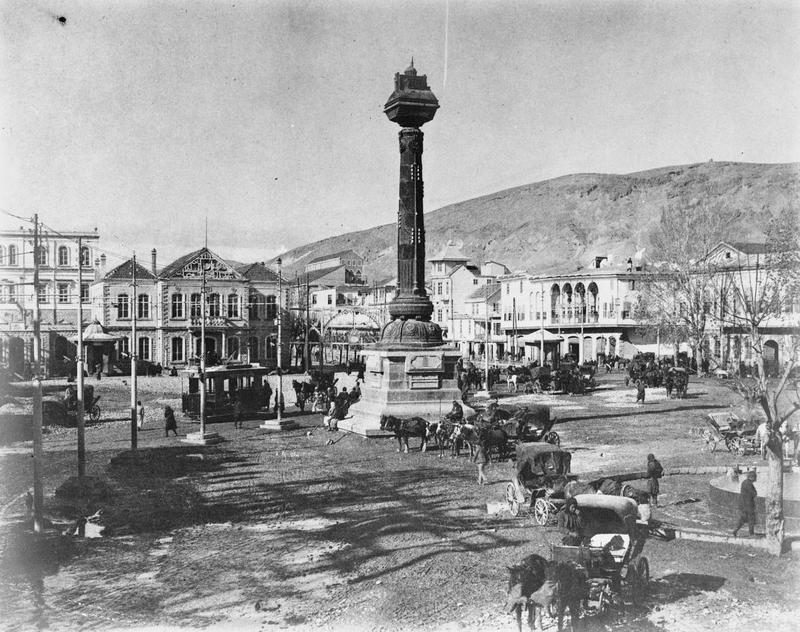
Hejaz railway, Damascus square and pillar. The gabled building is the Hejaz Railway Line office.

== See also ==
- Transport in Syria
- Damascus–Amman railway
- Adana–Aleppo railway
- Arab Mashreq International Railway
- Hejaz railway
- List of town tramway systems in Asia
- List of countries by rail transport network size
