= Aleppo railway station =

Railway station in Aleppo, Syria

Aleppo railway station محطة قطار حلب
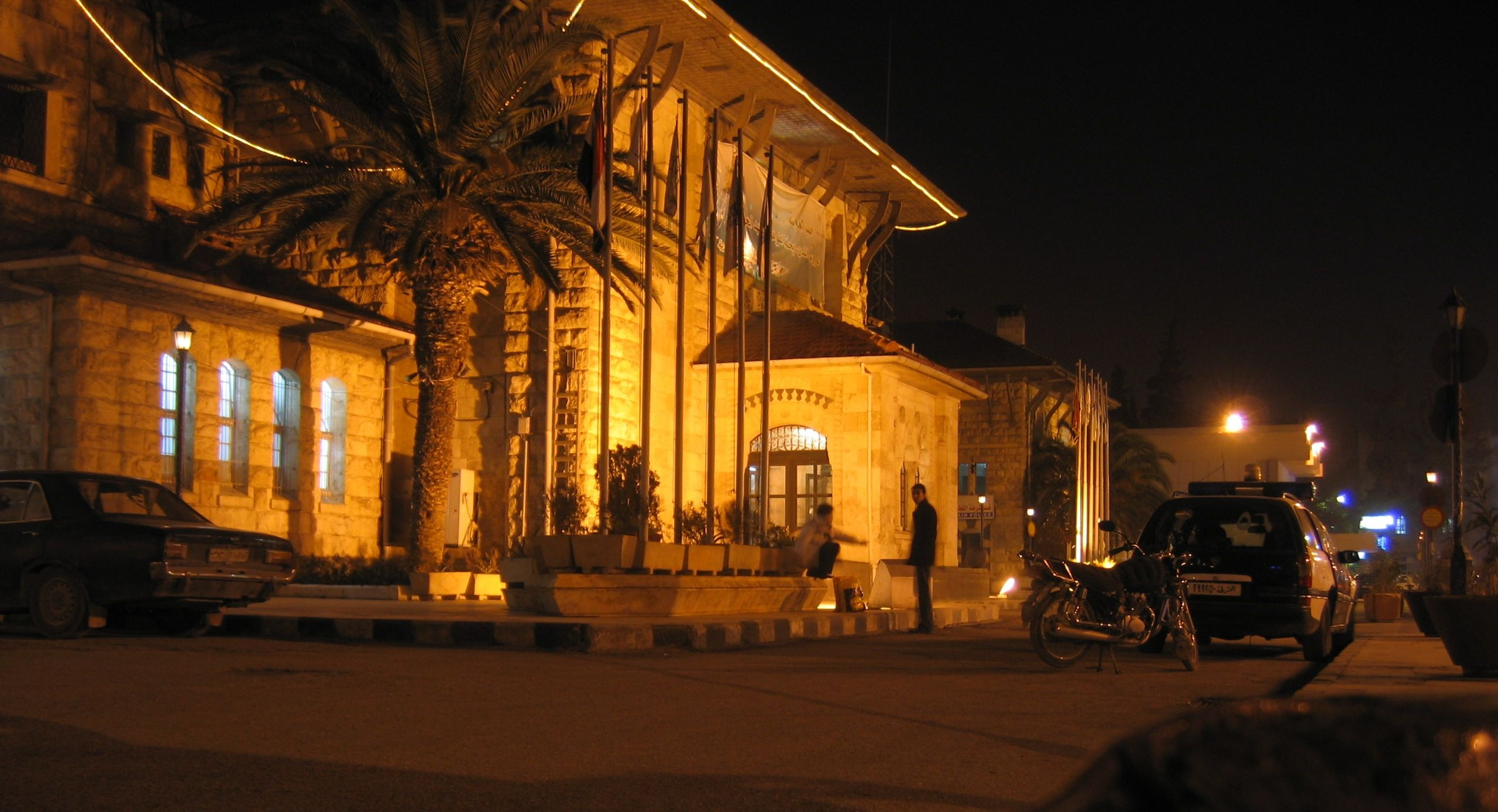

General information
- Location: Mahattet Baghdad Street, Gare de Bagdad district, Aleppo, Syria
- Coordinates: 36°12′50″N 37°8′52″E
- Owner: Syrian Railways
- Lines: Berlin–Baghdad railway; Damascus-Aleppo railway; Aleppo-Nusaybin railway

History
- Opened: 1912; 114 years ago
- Rebuilt: 2017–2021
Location

Aleppo railway station (Arabic: محطة قطار حلب) more commonly Gare de Bagdad (Arabic: محطة بغداد), is the 2nd oldest railway station in Syria and the main station of the city of Aleppo. It was opened in 1912 as part of the Berlin–Baghdad railway. The first ever trip from the station was towards the town of Jarabulus.

== History ==
=== Ottoman era ===
The Aleppo Baghdad railway station was built in 1912 by German engineers as part of the Berlin–Baghdad railway project. By the beginning of World War I, the railway had reached Aleppo, with a branch extending to Tripoli, Lebanon, and later continued eastward to Nusaybin by October 1918.

During the war, the Ottoman Empire, allied with the German Empire and the Central Powers, decided to recover the infrastructure south of Aleppo to Lebanon in 1917. The Baghdad Railway created opportunity and problems for both sides, being unfinished but running just south of the then defined Syrian–Turkish border.

Post war, the border was redrawn, and the railway was now north of the border. From 1922 the Baghdad Railway was worked in succession by two French companies, who were liquidated in 1933 when the border was again redrawn, placing the Baghdad Railway section again in Syrian control.

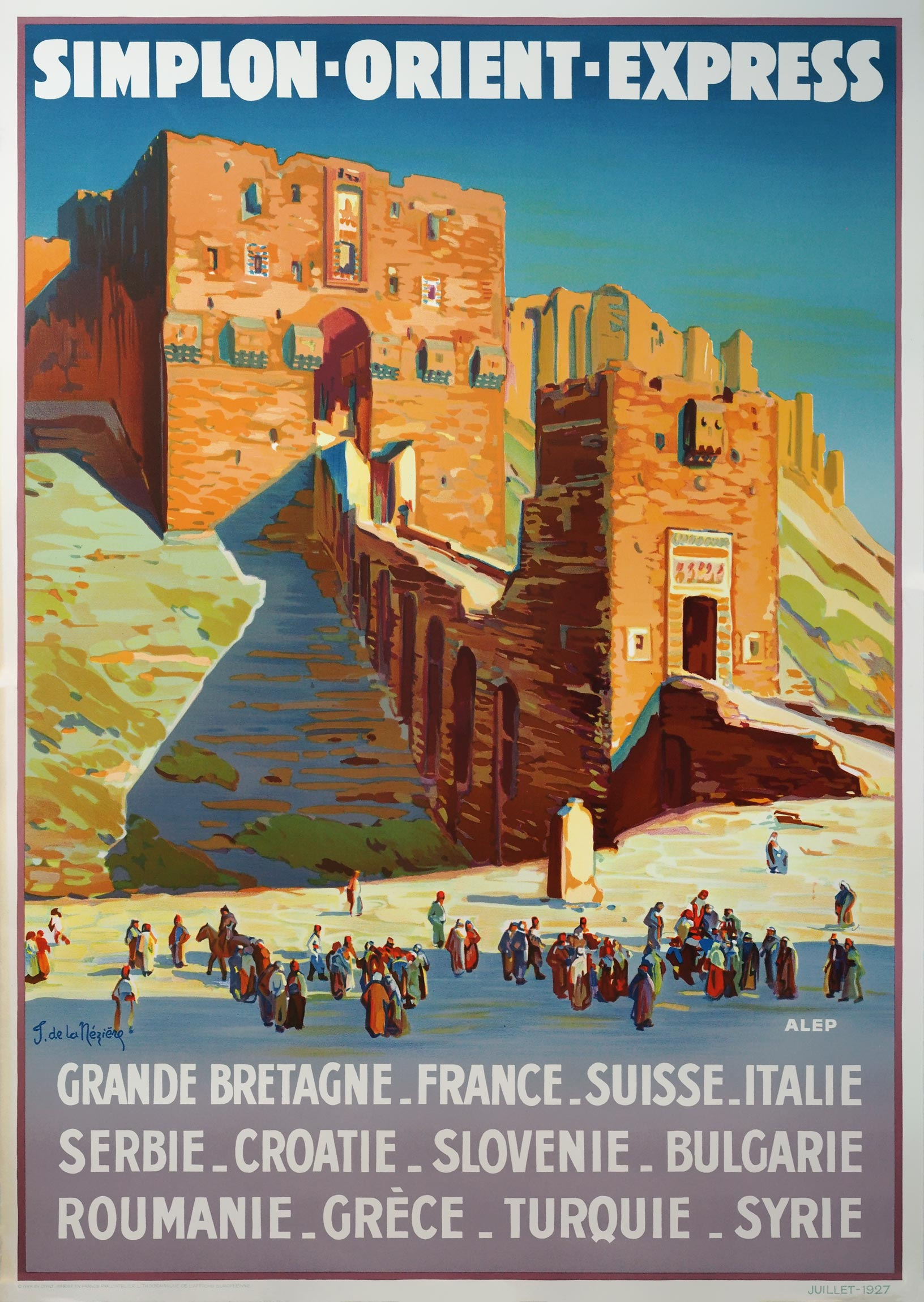
A poster advertising the Simplon Orient Express, whose route ended in Aleppo (1930s).

=== French Mandate and independence era ===
A new agreement was subsequently achieved between the French controlled Syria and the Ottoman Sham-Hama Railway Company (the operator of Damascus Railway) to put the Aleppo Railway under the management of the company for 15 years. As a result, the Aleppo railway line was connected with Damascus.

During the 1940s, after the independence of Syria from the French mandate, the management agreement was expired and the Syrian government itself took over the administration of the Aleppo Railway with the establishment of the new Syrian Railway Company at the end of the 1940s.

In 1956, the Syrian government decided to purchase the shares of the Sham-Hama Railway Company in Syria. As a result, all railways in Syria were nationalised and operated under one administration. Later, starting from 1 January 1965, the Syrian Railway was reorganised as Syrian Railways (CFS), headquartered in Aleppo.

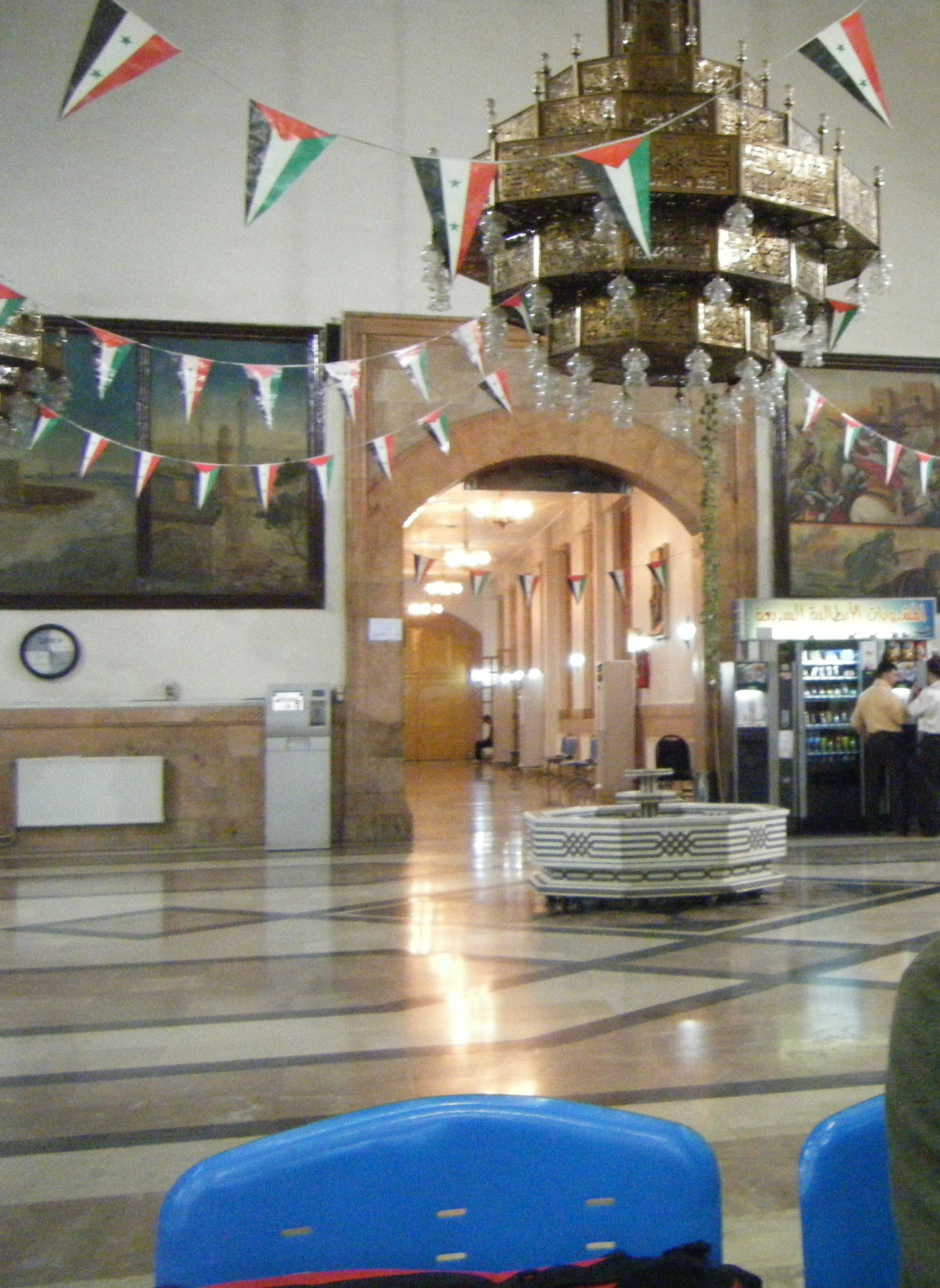
Main hall of the Aleppo Railway Station in 2010

=== Civil war ===
Until 2011, the Aleppo railway station was connected with Damascus, Latakia, Hama, Homs, Qamishly and Deir ez-Zor with daily trips. In 2012, the rail traffic was stopped because of the Syrian civil war. On 25 January 2017, train services resumed in Aleppo for the first time in four years, once again making the station operational. Reconstruction of the Damascus-Aleppo railway line was started in 2020, after its completion and securing rail transport were planned to be resumed.

The station was taken by the Free Syrian Army during the Second Battle for Aleppo in the course of the 2024 Syrian opposition offensives that led to the Fall of the Assad regime.

=== Post-war ===
Train services to Hama and Damascus were resumed in August 2025.

== See also ==
- Hejaz railway station, Damascus
- Rail transport in Syria
