= Tubize Type 50 =

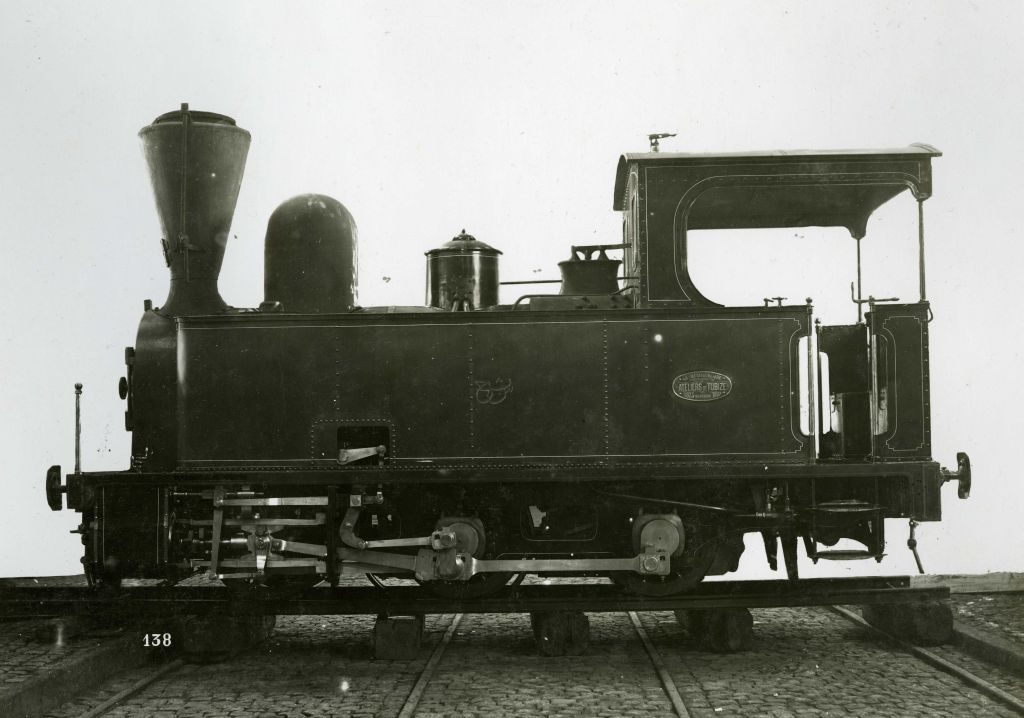
- Tubize Type 50, built for service in Lebanon.
Type and origin
- Power type: steam
- Builder: Ateliers Métallurgiques de Tubize
- Serial number: 872-879
- Build date: 1892
- Total produced: 8
Specifications
- Configuration
  - Whyte: 0-6-0T
- Gauge: 1,050 mm (3 ft 5 11/32 in)
- Driver dia.: 850 mm (33 in)
- Length: 6,830 mm (22 ft 5 in)
- Width: 2,500 mm (8 ft 2 in)
- Loco weight: empty: 18,890 kg (41,650 lb), when full: 22,400 kg (49,400 lb)
- Fuel type: coal
- Tender cap.: coal:1 m^{3} (35 cu ft), water: 3.35 m^{3} (740 imp gal)
- Boiler pressure: 12 kg/cm^{2}
- Cylinder size: 350 mm (14 in) bore × 360 mm (14 in) stroke
Performance figures
- Maximum speed: 30 km/h (19 mph)
Career
- Operators: Original Société Ottomane du Chemins de fer de Damas-Hamah et Prolongements (DHP), later: Syrian Railways, Chemin de fer de l'État Libanais, one unit on the Hejaz Railway in Saudi Arabia
- Locale: Ottoman Empire, later: Syria, Lebanon, Saudi Arabia
- Delivered: 1892
- Disposition: One example, static display in Saudi Arabia

The Tubize Type 50 is a Belgian 1,050 mm (3 ft 5 11/32 in) narrow gauge tank engine steam locomotive built by Ateliers de Tubize for use on railways in the Ottoman Empire in 1892. After the break-up of the Empire, they were used in Lebanon, Syria and Saudi Arabia. According to company records, they were similar to locomotives built for the Belgian State Railways.

The locomotives were used on the DHP's Hauran line from Damascus to Muzeirib. Numbers 103, 104, 107 and 108 survived World War I and were used by the Chemin de fer de l'État Libanais CEL. The other four locomotives do not show in records past 1925. The one Saudi locomotive (see below) is thought to have been sent to that country during World War I, although no official records to confirm this have been found.

== Technical details ==
The narrow-gauge locomotives were capable of 30 km/h (19 mph) in service and had a 75 m (246 ft) turning radius. The first two units were delivered in October 1892, with the balance delivered 5 months later, with delivery completed in 1893. Photos exist of the units in service with the CEL in Lebanon as late as 1948.

== Preservation ==
One example is still extant at Al Madinah, Saudi Arabia; it is little more than a rusted frame. Circa 2012, it was moved to the Tabuk station and put on display, somewhat restored. It is presented along with other period rolling stock at the site. Saudi scholars have said it is a former 0-3-0T of the Hejaz railway, ex- Tramway Libanais number 8, but it has been identified from photos as a Tubize 0-6-0T unit. Based on analysis of Tubize company records, it would appear that this unit is DHP unit number 106 (Tubize builder number 877 built in 1893), one of the units missing from records after 1925.

The Saudi unit was restored by former Indian Railways personnel before display at the station museum.
