= Akkari =

Akkari is a surname.

The word akkari (عقاري) means real estate in Arabic. The same word, pronounced and spelled slightly differently in Arabic but spelled and written the same way in English may reference the name of a town in Syria, Akkari (عكاري).

Notable people with the surname include:

- Abdulrahman Akkari (born 1984), Syrian footballer
- Ahmed Akkari (born 1978), Lebanese-born Danish activist
- André Akkari (born 1974), Brazilian poker player
- Mohammad Akkari, Lebanese basketball player
- Nazem Akkari, Lebanese politician and Prime Minister of Lebanon
