= Rail transport in Jordan =

Rail transport in Jordan refers to the two main railways in Jordan both of whom are direct descendants of the 1908 Ottoman Hejaz railway in Transjordan. The main rail is the Hejaz Jordan Railway which operates passenger trains. The second rail is the Aqaba Railway, which closed in 2018. Aqaba Railway was a freight train that transported phosphate to the port of Aqaba until 2018. Jordan has a total of 507 km of narrow gauge railways (1,050 mm (3 ft 5 11/32 in)) as of 2008.

The Hejaz Jordan Railway is the only passenger railway currently operating in Jordan, connecting Jiza, Amman, Zarqa and Mafraq. Previously it used to connect to Damascus until the Syrian Civil War caused the closure of the Jordanian-Syrian train link. The Jordanian part is narrow gauge; the rest of the Syrian network uses 1,435 mm (4 ft 8 1/2 in) standard gauge.

== Hejaz Jordan Railway ==
Hejaz Jordan Railway
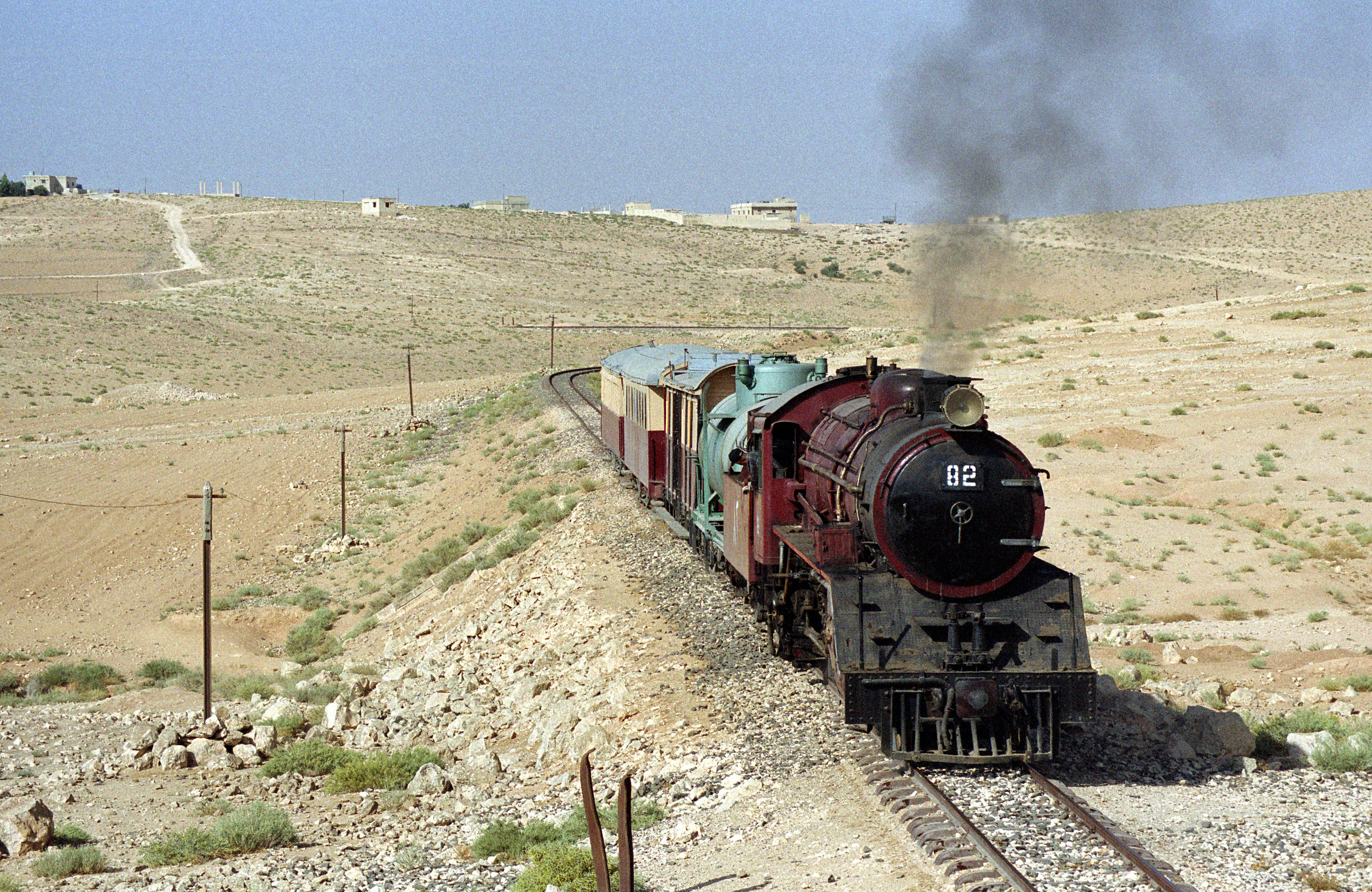
- Hejaz Jordan Railway steam locomotive traveling from Mafraq in 2000. One of several Thai Pacific locomotives built in Japan for Thailand, it (and several others) was never delivered there and ended up in on the HJR as the railway's number 82.

Overview
- Headquarters: Amman
- Reporting mark: HJR
- Locale: western Jordan
- Dates of operation: 1920–present
- Predecessor: Hejaz Railway

Technical
- Track gauge: 1,050 mm (3 ft 5 11/32 in)
- Length: 1,320 km (820 mi)

Other
- Website: http://www.jhr.gov.jo/

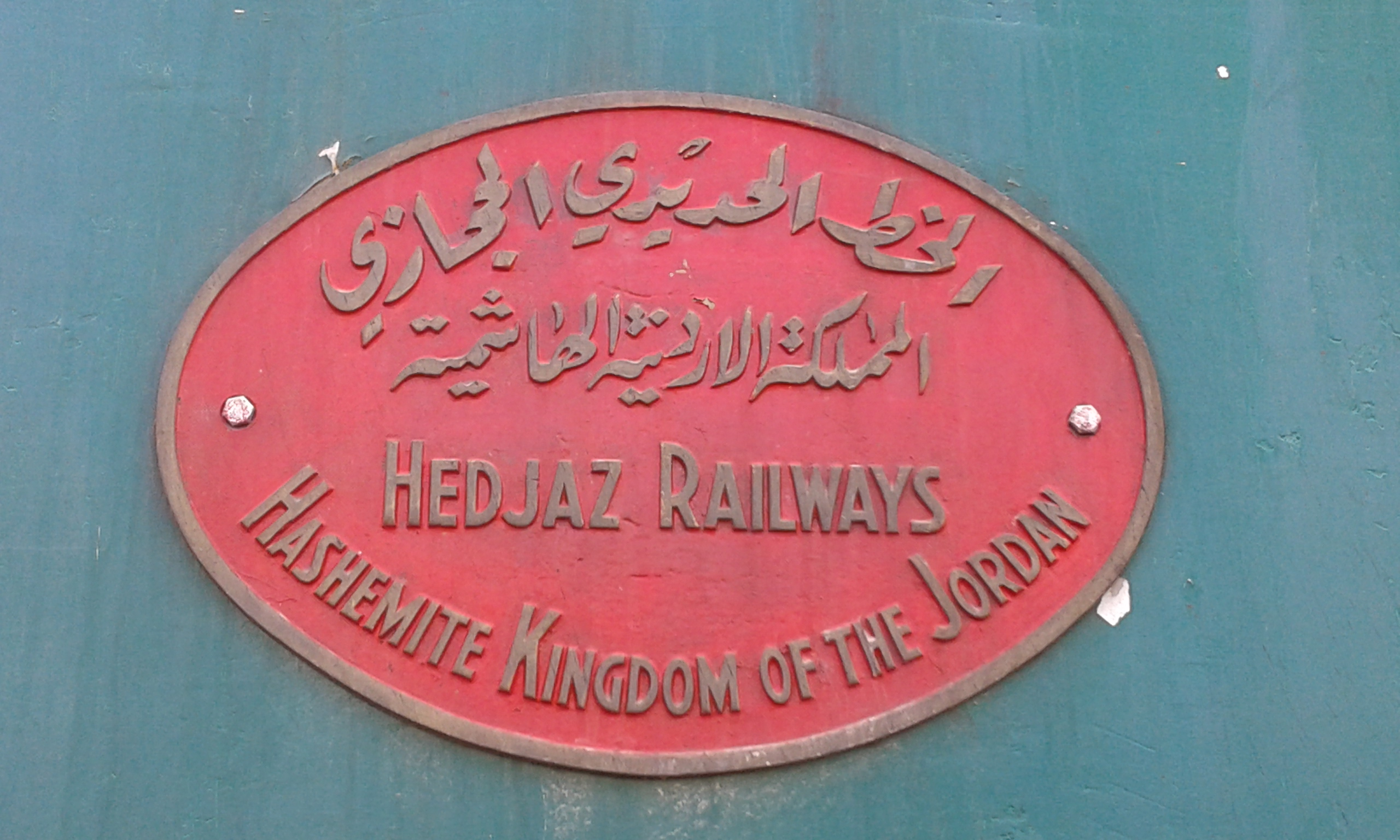
Label on a locomotive of Hejaz Jordan Railway.

The Hejaz Jordan Railway (HJR) is one of the two successor railways to the 1908 Ottoman Hejaz Railway in Jordan. When the Ottoman Empire collapsed in 1920, the Hejaz Railway, formerly under Ottoman control, was divided into 2 railways: the Aqaba Railway and the Hejaz Jordan Railway. When Jordan became independent in 1946, the HJR served as the main railway of Jordan for passengers. In 1975 the HJR built a line branch line from Ma'an to Aqaba on the Red Sea. The line was later sold to the Aqaba Railway Corporation in 1979.

Since the Syrian Civil War the Hejaz Jordan Railway connection between Jordan and the Damascus terminal in Syria has been suspended. In September 2025, Turkey, Syria and Jordan agreed on a draft memorandum to restore the track built by the historic Hejaz Railway between the three countries.

=== Stations ===
List of stations.

- Jabir as-Sirhan
- Mafraq
- Khirbet us-Samra
- Zarqa
- Russeifa
- Amman
- Qasr
- Lubin
- Al-Jizah
- Daba'a
- Khan az-Zibib
- Suaq
- Qatrana
- Menzil
- Faraifra
- Al-Hassa
- Jurf ed-Darawish
- Uneiza
- Wadi al-Hardon
- Maʿan
- Gadir al-Hajj
- Al-Shediya
- Abu Tarafa
- Al-Shifia
- Fassu'a
- Aqaba al-Hejaz
- Batn al-Ghul
- Wadi Rasem
- Tel esh-Sham
- Mudawwara

=== Locomotives ===
The following may not be a complete list.

==== Steam ====
Steam locomotives include:

Running number	Wheel arrangement	Builder and works number	Date built
23	2-8-2	Robert Stephenson & Hawthorns, 7433	1951
51	2-8-2	Arnold Jung, 12081	1955
61 (63)	2-6-2T	Haine St Pierre, Belgium, 2147	1955
71	2-8-2	Haine St Pierre, Belgium, 2144	1955
82	4-6-2	Nippon Sharyo, 1610	1953/1959 (sources differ)

==== Diesel ====
Diesel locomotives include:

Quantity	Wheel arrangement	Builder and type	Date built
3	A1A-A1A	GE U10B	1976

=== Museum ===
There is a museum at Amman station. In 2003, it contained more than 250 exhibits, including murals depicting the development of the railway.

== Aqaba Railway ==
Aqaba Railway

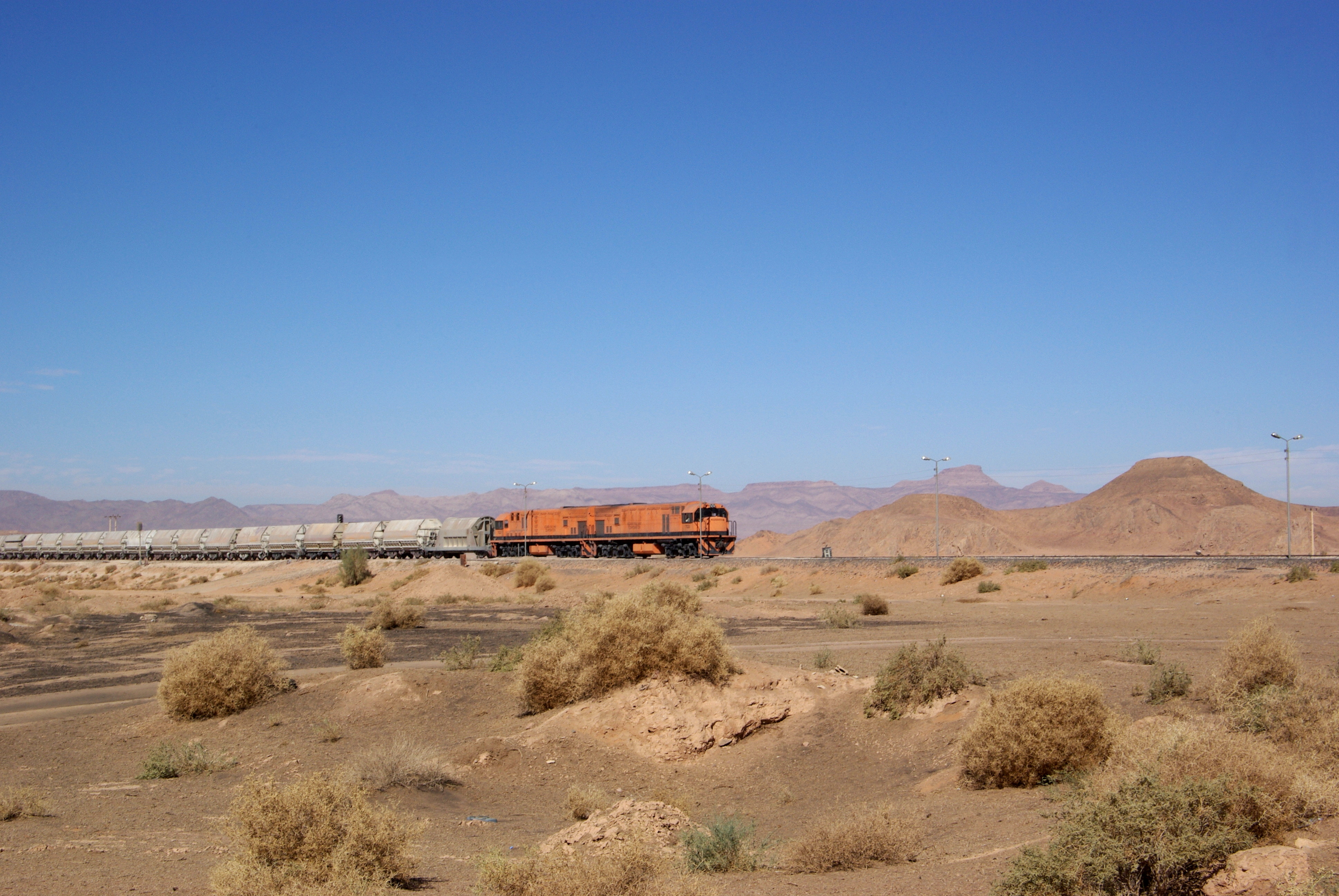
- A phosphate train near Ma'an

Overview
- Headquarters: Aqaba
- Reporting mark: ARC
- Locale: Jordan
- Dates of operation: 1979–2018
- Predecessor: Hejaz Railway

Technical
- Track gauge: 1,050 mm (3 ft 5 11/32 in)

Other
- Website: https://www.arcjo.com/

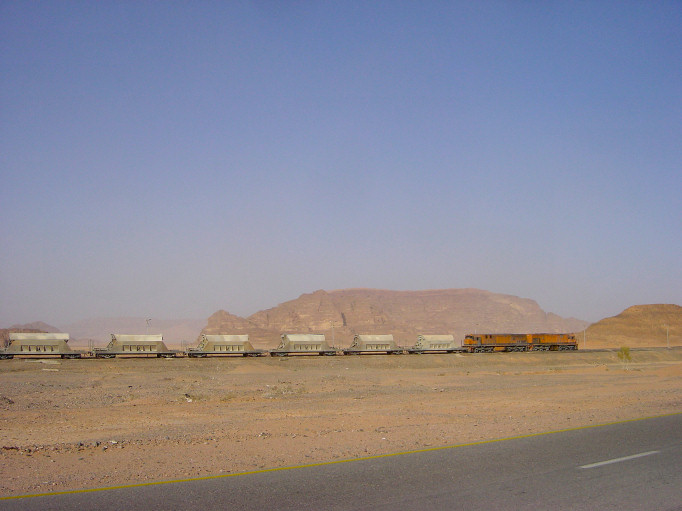
A phosphate train near Ma'an.

The Aqaba Railway was a freight railway that was managed by the Aqaba Railway Corporation (ARC) and operated in southern Jordan. The railway was formed in 1979 to transport phosphate to the port in Aqaba. It partly used the tracks of the 1908 Ottoman Hejaz Railway. Operations of the railway were suspended in 2018 when phosphate transport was transferred to a new terminal which is not rail connected. A successor line to transport phosphate from Al Shidiya and Ghor es-Safi to the new terminal in Port of Aqaba is planned through an agreement between Jordan's Ministry for Transport and Etihad Rail.

=== History ===
In 1908 the Ottoman Empire built the Hejaz Railway, that ran from Damascus to Medina. After World War I and the fall of the Ottoman Empire, the railway never operated south of Ma'an. The Hejaz Jordan Railway operated the tracks of the Hejaz railway in Jordan. In 1975 the railway built a branch from Ma'an to Aqaba, a port city on the Gulf of Aqaba. In 1979 the Aqaba Railway Corporation (ARC) was incorporated and took over the route from Abiad to Aqaba. The purpose of the ARC was to transport phosphates from mines near Abiad and Ma'an to the port in Aqaba. The ARC operated only freight trains powered by GE U17C diesel locomotives.

== History ==
Jordan had two connected but non-contiguously operated sections of the 1908 Ottoman Hejaz Railway that still exist:

- From Jiza, south of Jordan to Amman and then to Damascus, as the "Hejaz Jordan Railway". The northern part of the train connecting Amman to Damascus ceased to operate due to the Syrian Civil War.
- From phosphate mines near Ma'an to the Gulf of Aqaba as the "Aqaba Railway". Aqaba Railway ceased operations in 2018 after the transport of phosphate was moved to a different terminal in Port of Aqaba

In the 2000s, Jordanian government began acquiring land for new rail routes. Following a study by BNP Paribas, three routes were planned, which were expected to be tendered later in 2010. The three routes were:

1. From the Syrian border, via Zarqa, to the Saudi border; replacing part of the Hejaz Railway;
2. Connecting the first line to Aqaba, and from Mafraq to Irbid, replacing another part of the Hejaz railway;
3. A link to the Iraqi border.

However, in late 2010, the government announced an economic relief package and following the 2011 Jordanian protests it was decided to reduce the expected three-year capital investment plan in the national railway network by 72 percent, partly to fund the relief package.

In August 2011, the Jordanian government approved the construction of the railway from Aqaba to the Iraqi border (near Trebil). Iraq started the construction of the line from the border to their current railhead at Ramadi.

Jordan planned for a Aqaba-Ma'an railway modernization with the Saudi Jordanian Investment Fund. In 2019 they signed a memorandum of understanding with the Aqaba Special Economic Zone Authority to invest 500 million JD (around $700 million) to redevelop the Aqaba-Ma'an railway alongside building a dry port in Ma'an. It plans to upgrade the gauge from 1050mm as built in 1975 to 1435mm Standard gauge.

== See also ==
- Transport in Jordan
- Gulf Railway
