= Damascus–Amman railway =

Train service between Damascus, Syria and Amman, Jordan

Damascus–Amman railway (a.k.a. Hejaz railway)
Overview
- Service type: Inter-city rail
- Status: Operating
- Locale: Southern Syria, northern Jordan
- First service: 1924
- Current operators: Syrian Railways and General Organization of the Hejaz Railway (Syrian part); JHR (Jordanian part)

Route
- Termini: Damascus Qaddam station Amman Central station
- Distance travelled: 222.4 kilometers (138.2 mi)
- Service frequency: Daily

On-board services
- Seating arrangements: Coach

Technical
- Rolling stock: Mavag railcars
- Track gauge: 1,050 mm (3 ft 5 11/32 in)
- Track owners: Syrian Railways (Syrian part); JHR (Jordanian part)

The Damascus–Amman railway is an international train service operating on the historical Hejaz railway that runs from Damascus, Syria to Amman, Jordan. It is currently the only passenger train operating in Jordan. The train operates on narrow gauge tracks of 1,050 mm (3 ft 5 11/32 in).

== History ==
The Hejaz railway opened in 1908 by the Ottoman Empire from Damascus to Medina. Service was suspended during World War I. After the war only the Damascus-Ma'an section re-opened. In 1924, the International Train ran its first trip from Hejaz railway station in Damascus to Ma'an. Since 1960 the train only ran from Damascus to Amman. Diesel Locomotives became the primary power after 1976.

The Jordanian section of the railway is 217 kilometres (135 mi) long and is operated by the Jordan Hejaz Railway Corporation (JHR), which was established under Law No. 23 of 1952. Stations in Jordan include Mafraq, Kherbet Al-Samra, Zarqa, Amman, Al-Qasr, Al-Laban, Al-Jiza, Daba'a, Khan Al-Zabeeb, Suwaqa, Al-Qatraneh, and Al-Manzel.

The Syrian section of the railway was heavily damaged during the Syrian civil war. In 2025, restoration work began with the aim of reopening the entire route between the two countries.

== Gauge ==
In 2008 it was announced that the HJR and the CFH were planning to convert the line from narrow gauge to standard gauge.

== See also ==
- Hejaz railway
- Syrian Railways, the state railway operation
