= GE U17C =

1973 diesel–electric locomotive

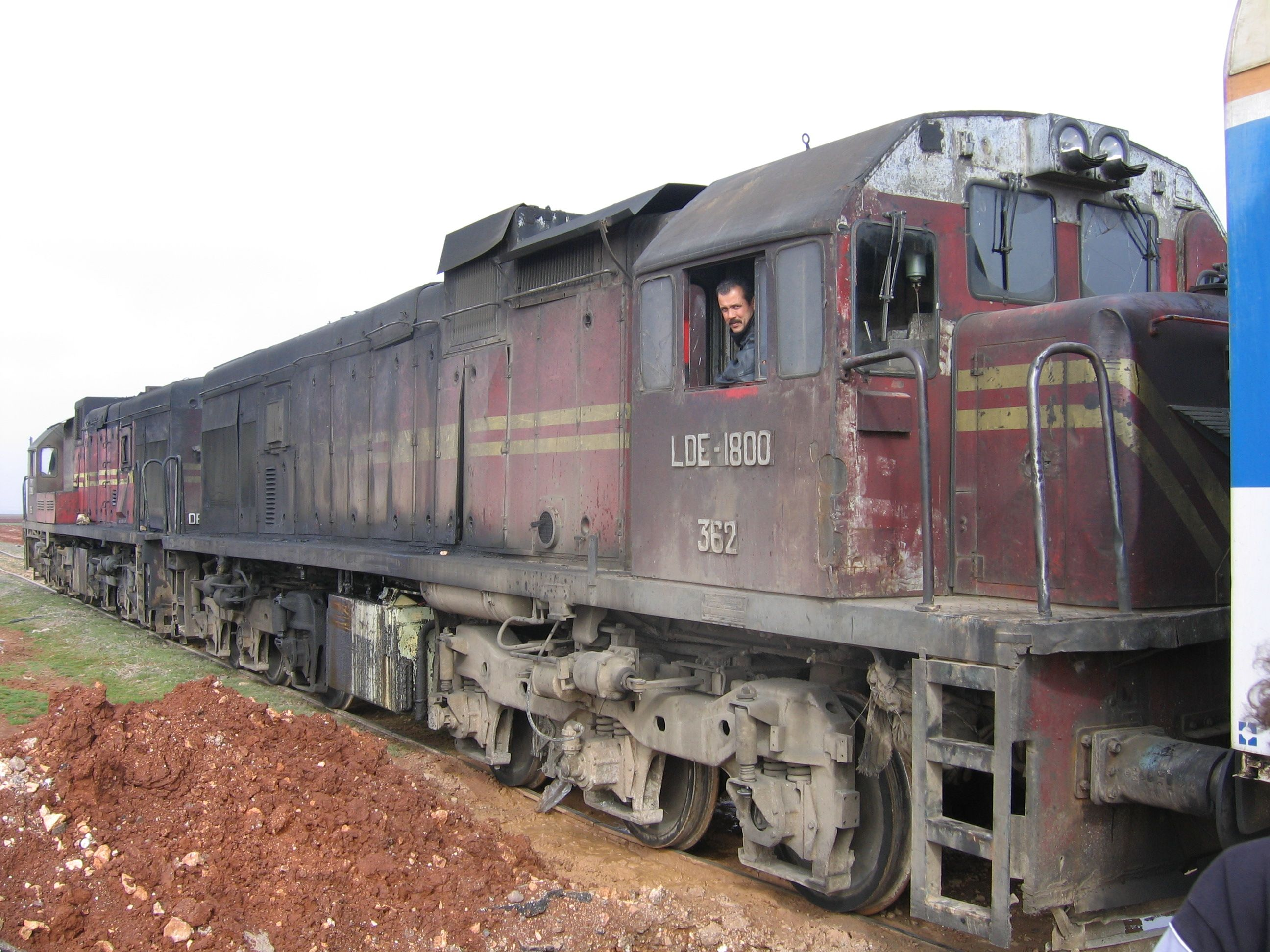
- U17C in service for Syrian Railways in Syria
Type and origin
- Power type: Diesel–electric
- Builder: General Electric
- Model: U17C
- Build date: 1973–1981
- Total produced: 30
Specifications
- Configuration
  - AAR: C-C
  - UIC: Co′Co′
- Gauge: 4 ft 8 1/2 in (1,435 mm)
- Length: 52 ft 9 in (16.08 m)
- Loco weight: 118,000 lb (53,524 kg) or 59 short tons (52.679 long tons; 53.524 t)
- Prime mover: GE FDL-8T
- Engine type: 4-stroke diesel
- Aspiration: Turbocharger
- Displacement: 5,344 cu in (87.57 L)
- Generator: DC generator
- Traction motors: DC traction motors
- Cylinders: V8
- Cylinder size: 9 in × 10.5 in (228.6 mm × 266.7 mm)
- Transmission: diesel electric
- Loco brake: Straight air, Dynamic
- Train brakes: 26-L air
Performance figures
- Maximum speed: 64 mph (103 km/h)
- Power output: 1,700 hp (1,270 kW)
- Tractive effort: 57,000 lbf (253.5 kN) @ 30%
Career
- Operators: Syrian Railways, Hedjaz Jordan Railway; Aqaba Railway
- Locale: Syria, Lebanon, Jordan

The GE U17C diesel–electric locomotive was introduced by GE Transportation as an export model road switcher locomotive in 1973. Easy to spot due to its relatively short length — 52 ft 9 in (16.08 m) — it was powered by the 8-cylinder FDL-8T engine. Very similar to the U18B, it included an extended body section to house a larger air filter and cooling units.

Original purchasers included Syria's CFS, and the Hedjaz Jordan Railway.

The GE U17C was also used on the Aqaba Railway Corporation for transporting phosphates from the Mines to Aqaba.

== Original Owners ==
Image	Railroad	Build date	Quantity	Works No.	Local Designation	Numbers	Notes
	Syrian Railways	1973	15	40664-78	LDE-1800	301-315	Intended for freight
	Syrian Railways	1-2/1976	4		LDE-1800	316-319	
	Syrian Railways	2/1976	15	40679-93	LDE-1800	351-365	17001-IP, intended for passenger traffic
	Aqaba Railway	11-12/1974	10			954-963	1,050 mm (3 ft 5 11/32 in) track gauge.
	Hedjaz Jordan Railway	1979	18			?	1,050 mm (3 ft 5 11/32 in) track gauge.
