= Saudi Jordanian Investment Fund =

Partnership between Saudi Arabia and Jordan

The Saudi Jordanian Investment Fund
- Company type: Limited Public company
- Founded: 2017
- Headquarters: Amman, Jordan
- Key people: Abdulmajeed Al Hagbani (Chairman)
- Website: sjifund.com

The Saudi Jordanian Investment Fund Company (SJIF) is a partnership between Saudi Arabia and Jordan, which invests in infrastructure and other promising sectors in Jordan. The company is a (Limited Public Shareholding Company) registered per the Jordan Investment Fund Law number 16 for 2016. It aims to realize economic returns, aligning with Saudi Arabia's Vision 2030, and create a clear developmental impact in Jordan. The company was formed in 2017 following a legislative and institutional process between Saudi Arabia and Jordan. The main shareholder of the company is the Public Investment Fund of Saudi Arabia, which owns 90% of the company's share capital. The remaining 10% of the share capital is held by 16 Jordanian conventional and Islamic banks.
