= Latakia railway station =

Railway station of Latakia, Syria

Latakia
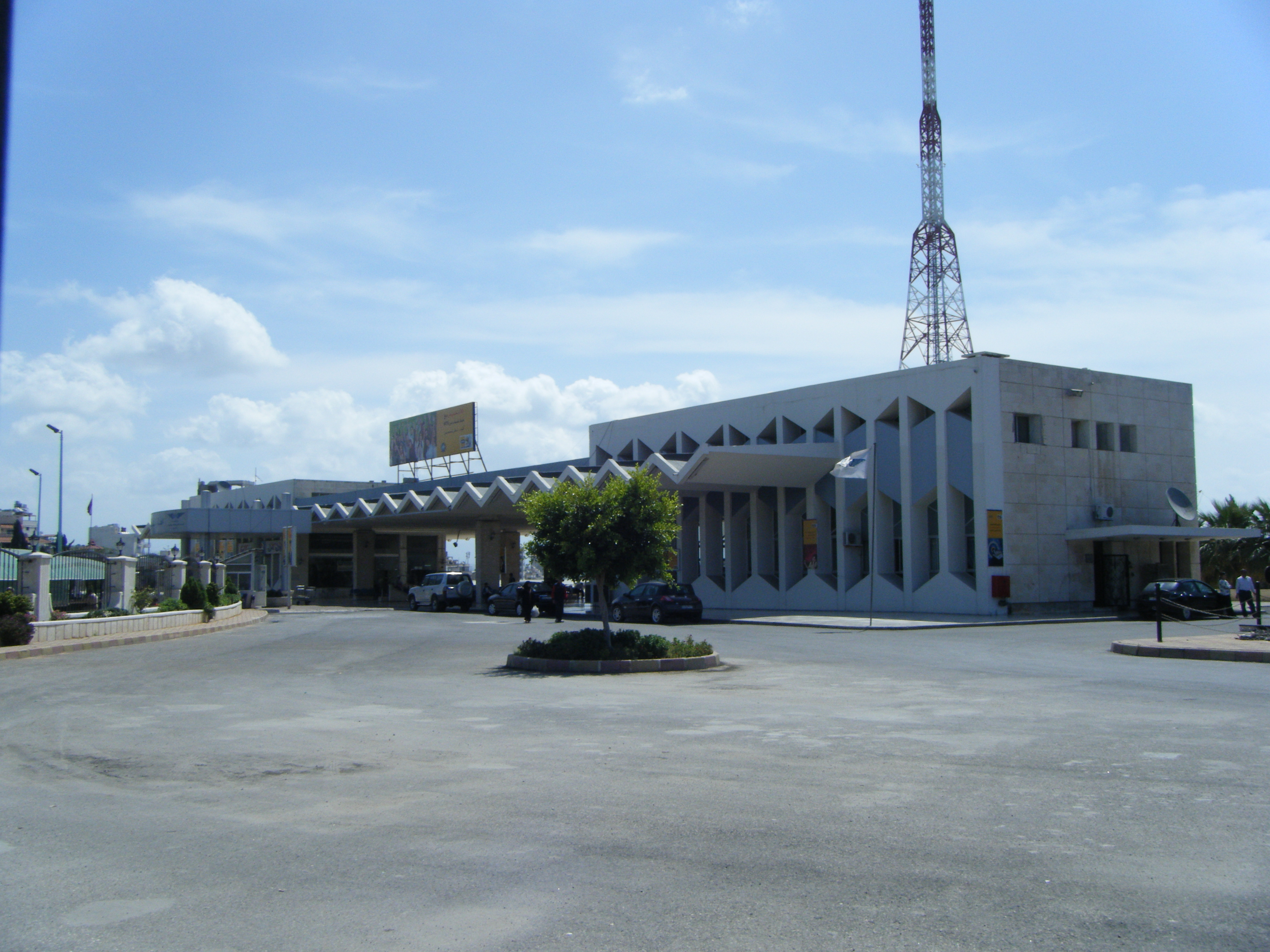
- Main building

General information
- Location: Yemen Square, Latakia, Latakia Governorate; Syria
- Coordinates: 35°30′57″N 35°47′14″E
- Owner: Syrian Ministry of Transport
- Operator: Syrian Railways
- Lines: Aleppo–Latakia line; Latakia–Tartus line
- Platforms: 3 (1 island platform and 2 side platforms)
- Tracks: 3

Construction
- Structure type: At-grade

History
- Opened: 1970s
Location

Latakia station (Arabic: محطة قطار اللاذقية, romanized: Maḥaṭṭat Qiṭār al-Lādhiqīyah) is a railway station in Latakia, Syria and the major railway hub of the coastal area. The station is located at the Yemen Square.

== History ==
The city of Latakia was actually a relatively late addition to the Syrian rail network. In 1975, the Aleppo–Latakia line was completed. The 80-km Tartus–Latakia coastal line was officially opened in 1992.
