= Akkari, Syria =

Akkari عكاري
- Village
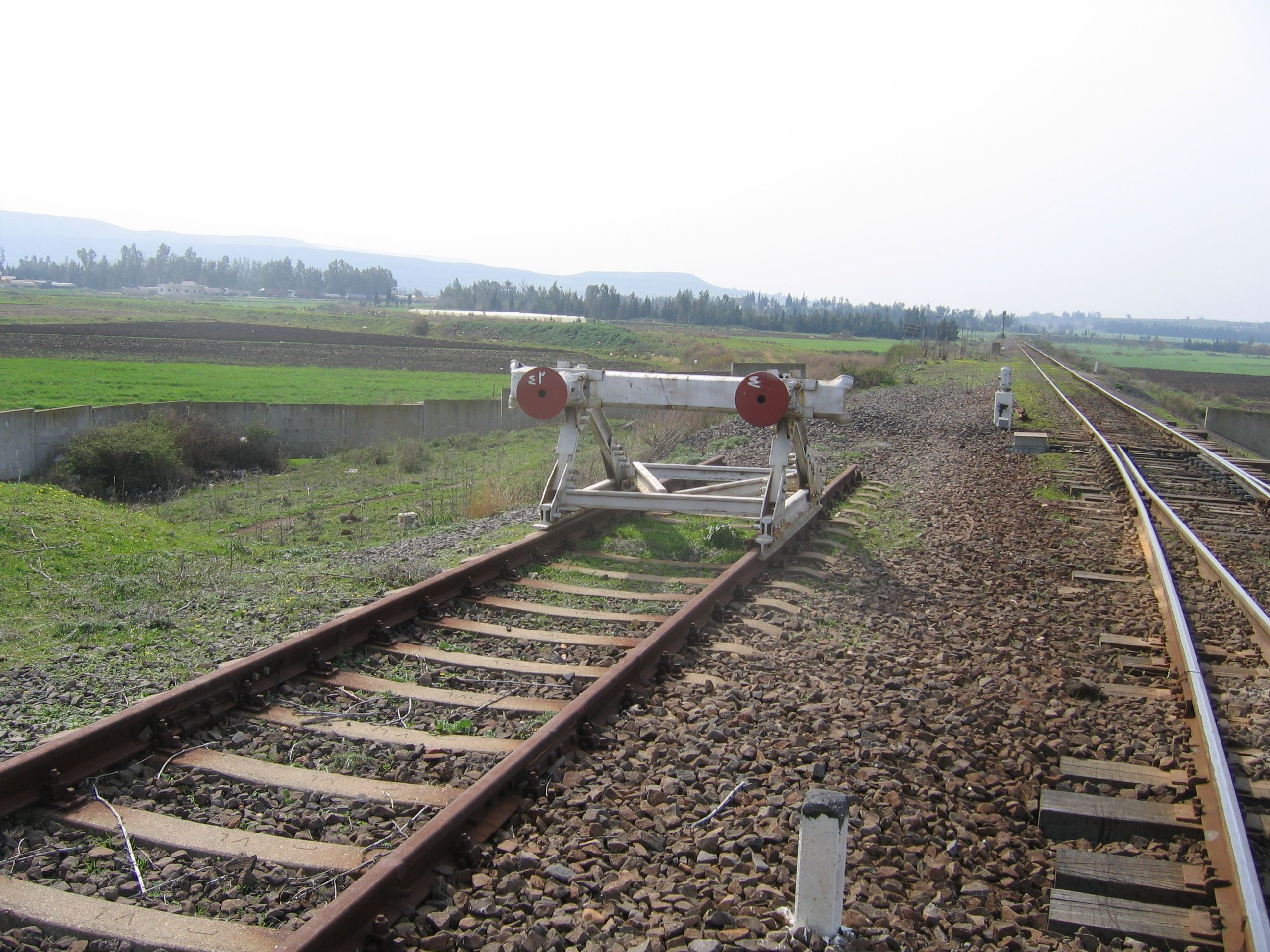
- Al-Akkari railway station, looking west. The former Palestine Railway route to Tripoli, Lebanon to the left and the route to the port city of Tartus to the right

- Location in Syria
- Coordinates: 34°40′0″N 36°11′0″E
- Country: Syria
- Governorate: Homs Governorate
- District: Talkalakh District
- Nahiyah: Talkalakh

Population (2004)
  - Total: 2,127
- Time zone: UTC+3 (EET)
  - Summer (DST): UTC+2 (EEST)

Akkari (Arabic: عكاري) is a town in northwestern Syria administratively belonging to the Homs Governorate just north of the border with Lebanon and west of Homs. Nearby towns include Talkalakh to the east, Marmarita to the northeast and Safita to the north. According to the Central Bureau of Statistics (CBS) al-Akkari had a population of 2,127 in 2004.

It was historically situated in an important crossroad for those moving between Turkey and coastal city of Beirut, Lebanon. A major road hub during both the Roman and Ottoman periods, the Palestine Railway built by the French passed through the al-Akkari. Reconnected after World War II, the railway was disconnected during the 1970s. The national railway operator, Syrian Railways, still has an operational station in the town.
