= Islamic banking in Saudi Arabia =

Despite the trend in the Saudi Arabian banking market to convert to full-fledged Islamic Banks, only four among the 12 local licensed banks are considered to be pure Islamic banks:

- Al-Rajhi Bank Saudi Arabia
- Al Jazeera Bank
- Al-Bilad Bank
- Alinma Bank

According to scholar of international finance, Ibrahim Warde, the two largest Islamic banking groups, Dar al-Maal al-Islami and al-Baraka Bank, have not been able to obtain licenses to operate commercial banks in Saudi Arabia, despite the fact that they are both owned by prominent Saudis. In 1985, the al-Rajhi Banking and Investment Company was authorized to engage in interest-free banking, but on the condition that it did not use the word "Islamic" in its name.

Saudi Arabia does not officially recognize the concept of Islamic banking. The logic is that if one bank is recognized as an Islamic institution then all others, by implication, would be un-Islamic. The official line was that all banks operating in Saudi Arabia were by definition Islamic.

== See also ==
- List of banks in Saudi Arabia
- Islamic banking and finance
