= Hejaz railway station, Damascus =

Former railway station in Damascus, Syria

Hejaz railway station محطة الحجاز
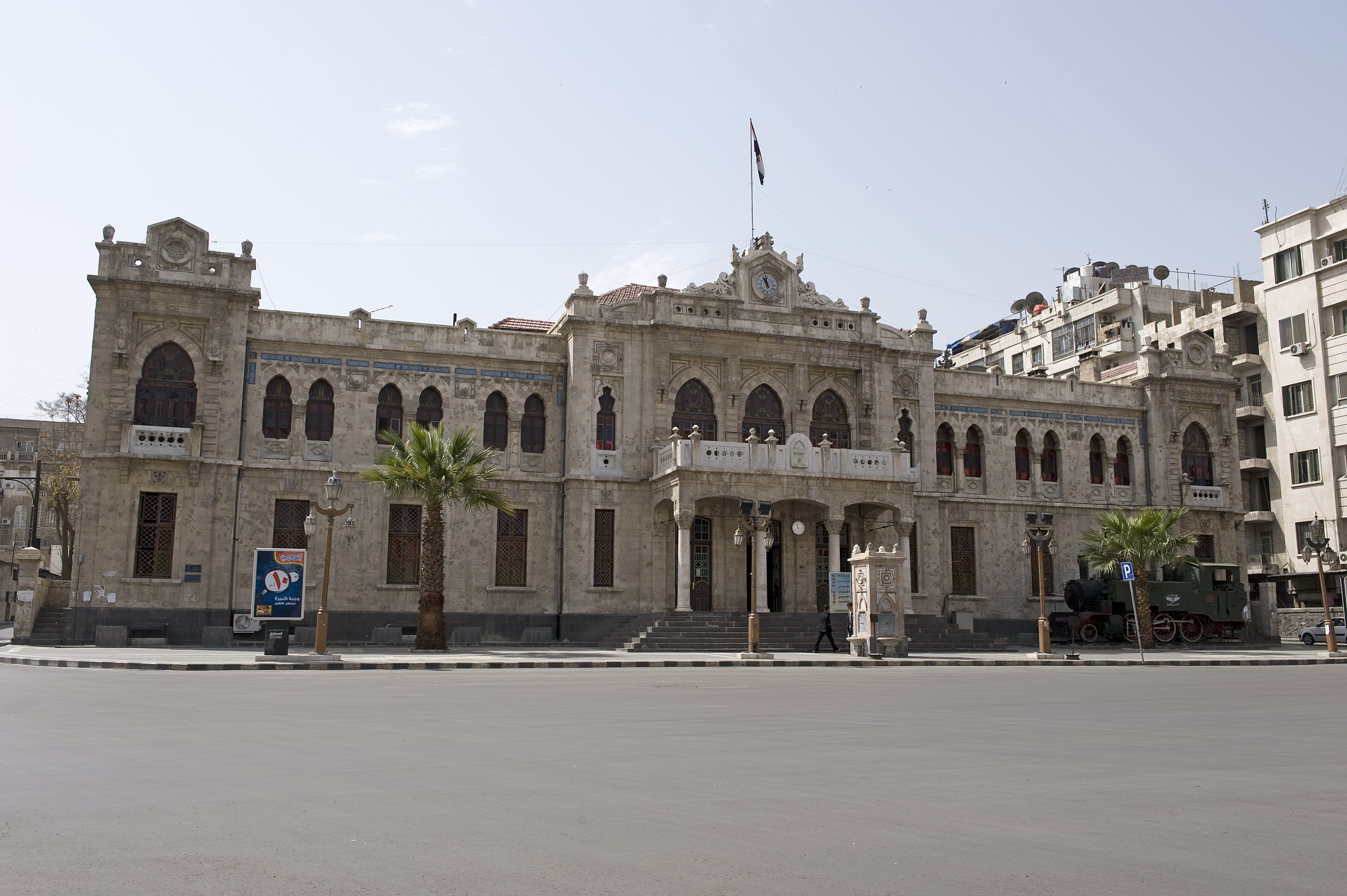

General information
- Location: Hejaz Square, Al-Qanawat, Damascus, Syria
- Coordinates: 33.511149°N 36.294949°E
- Line: Historical Hejaz railway

Construction
- Architect: Fernando De Aranda

History
- Opened: 1913; 113 years ago
- Closed: 1920; 106 years ago
Location

Hejaz railway station (Arabic: محطة الحجاز, romanized: Maḥaṭṭat al-Ḥijāz) is a former main railway station in central Damascus, Syria, close to the Marjeh Square. It was built as part of the Hejaz railway project.

== History ==
The station was put into operation under the Ottoman Empire in 1907, when the first section of the line to the south of Tabuk was opened. In 1909 the trains circulated frequently between Damascus and Medina.

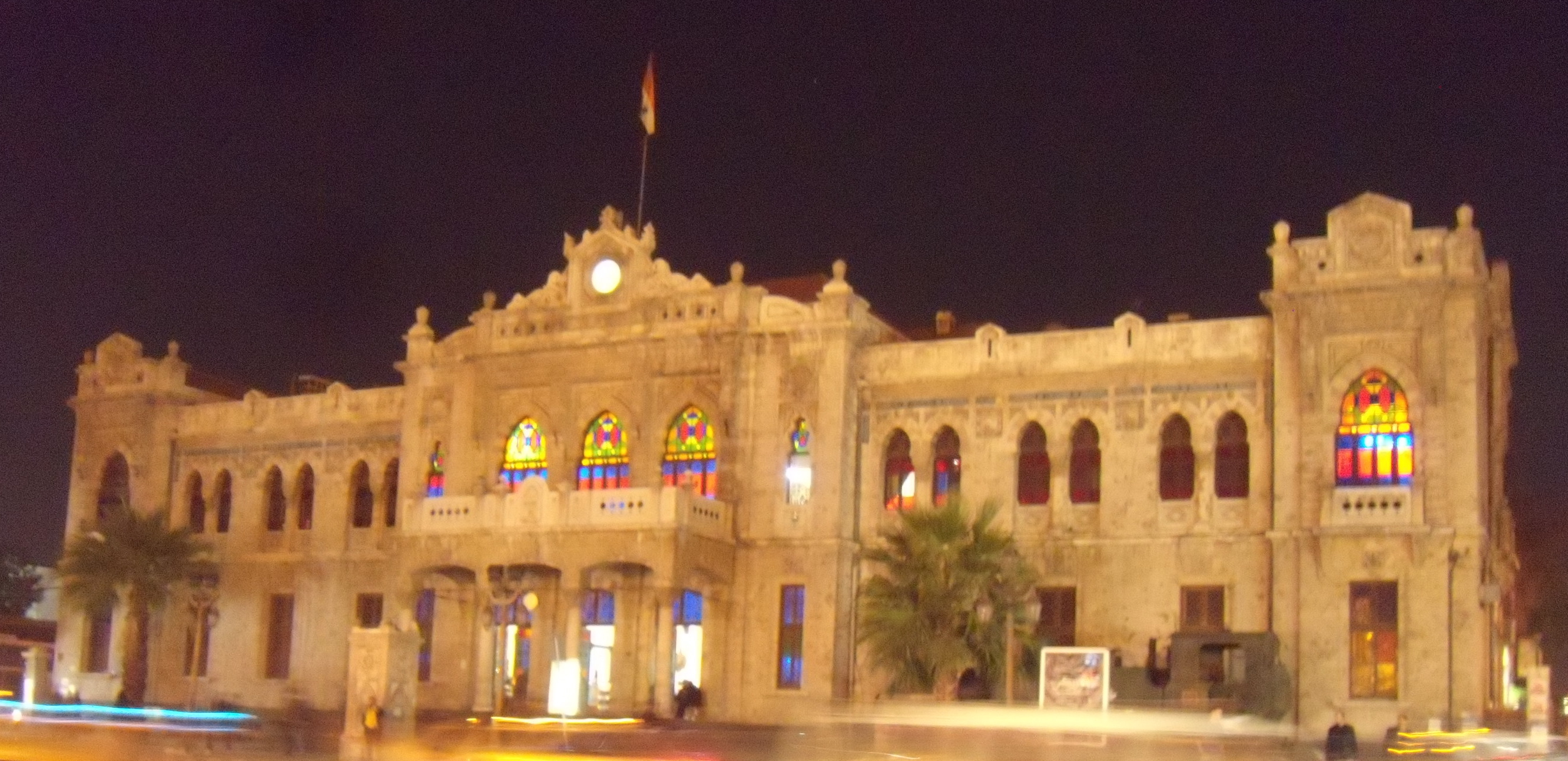
Night view in 2009

The passenger building, designed by the Spanish architect Fernando De Aranda, was commissioned in 1913. The building later became a historical monument and a Swiss-made locomotive was exhibited in front of it.

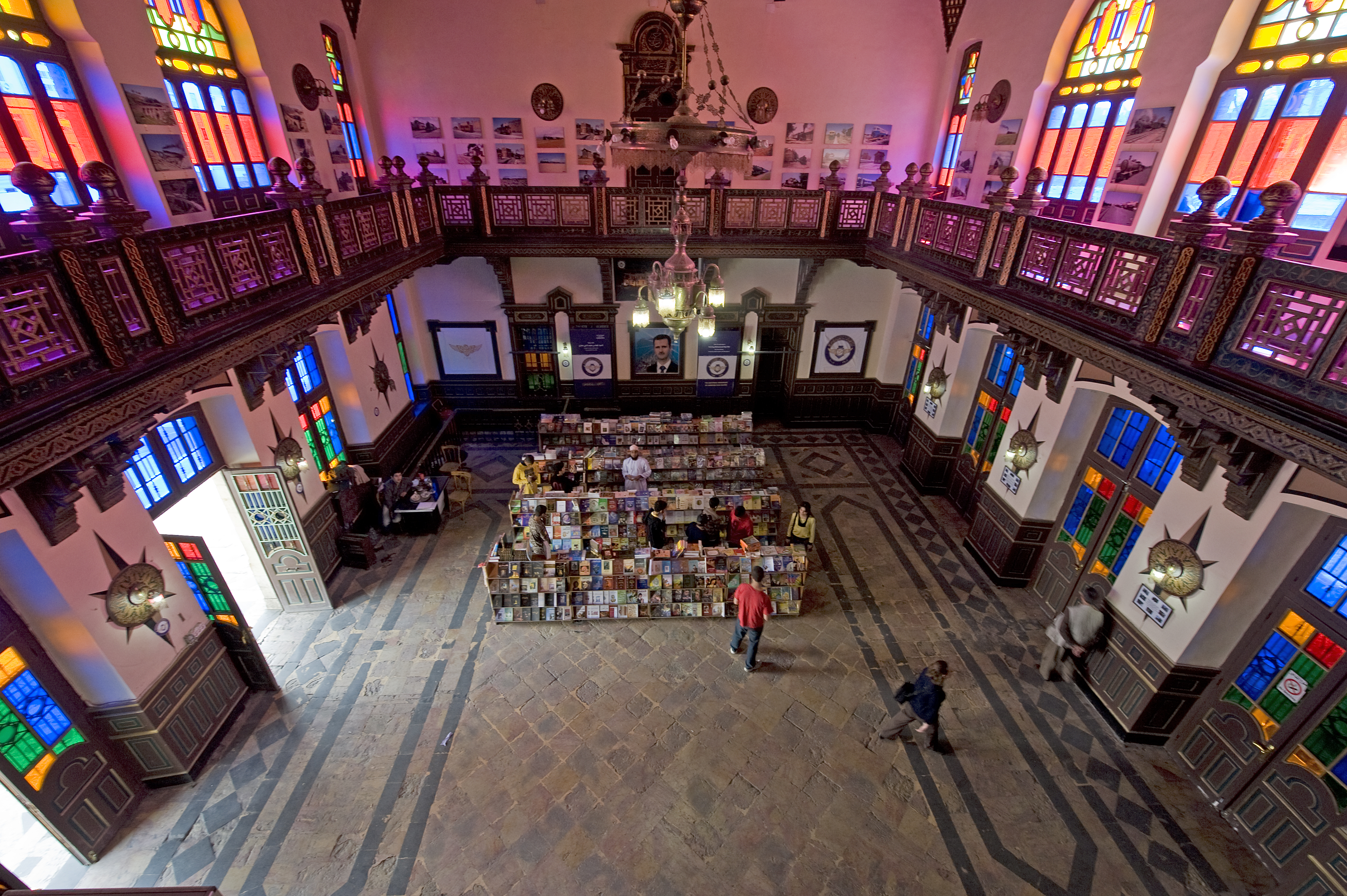
Interior of the passenger building

The station's interior has a decorated ceiling. The actual platforms of the station are closed.

== See also ==
- Rail transport in Syria
- Hejaz railway
- Hejaz Railway Museum (Medina)
