= Syrian Railways =

Syrian national railway company

Syrian General Railway Corporation (CFS)
- Industry: Rail infrastructure management
- Founded: 1956; 70 years ago
- Headquarters: Aleppo, Syria
- Area served: Syria
- Key people: Osama Haddad (Chairman)
- Services: Rail signalling, maintenance, etc.
- Owner: Ministry of Transport
- Website: cfssyria.sy

Syrian General Railway Corporation (Arabic: المؤسسة العامة للخطوط الحديدية السورية, romanized: al-Muʾassasah al-ʿĀmmah lil-Khuṭūṭ al-Ḥadīdīyah al-Sūrīyah, French: Chemins de fer syriens, CFS) is a government-owned national railway operator for the state of Syria, subordinate to the Ministry of Transport. Syrian Railways is the owner of Syria's railway network.

It was established in 1956 and is headquartered in Aleppo. For operational purposes the company is divided into three regions: Central, Eastern and Northern.

== History ==
Logo of this company until 2025.

It was established in 1956. Previously, it was known in English as the General Establishment of Syrian Railways. At the end of 2004 CFS employed around 12,400 staff.

== See also ==
- Rail transport in Syria
- Transport in Syria
