= List of bridges in Lebanon =

== Historical and architectural interest bridges ==
	Name	Arabic	Distinction	Length	Type	Carries Crosses	Opened	Location	Governorate	Ref.
1	Leontes Bridge	جسر الليطاني			Masonry; 3 arches	Out of order Litani River	3rd or 4th century	Tyre; 33°20′22.9″N 35°15′03.2″E	South Governorate	
2	Nahr al-Kalb Bridge	جسر نهر الكلب			Masonry; 3 arches	Nahr al-Kalb		Zouk Mosbeh; 33°57′17.5″N 35°36′06.6″E	Mount Lebanon	
3	Mudeirej Bridge	جسر المديرج	Height : 75 m (246 ft)	430 m (1,410 ft)	Beam; Prestressed concrete	Beirut-Damascus Highway	1998	Hammana; 33°48′02.4″N 35°43′37.8″E	Mount Lebanon	

== Other bridges ==
- Qasmiyeh Bridge
- Old Qasmiyeh Bridge
- Khardali Bridge
- Zrariyeh Bridge
- Qaquaiya Bridge
- Tayr Felsay Bridge
- Barghoz Bridge
- Dallafeh Bridge

== See also ==
- Geography of Lebanon
- Transport in Lebanon
- Rail transport in Lebanon
- List of Roman bridges
