= EMD GM6W =

Type and origin
- Power type: Diesel–electric
- Builder: EMD
- Model: GM6W
- Build date: 1960
- Total produced: unknown
Specifications
- Configuration
  - Whyte: 6wDE
  - AAR: C
- Gauge: 4 ft 8 1/2 in (1,435 mm); South Africa: 3 ft 6 in (1,067 mm) Cape gauge
- Prime mover: EMD 6-567C
- Engine type: 2-stroke diesel
- Aspiration: Roots-type supercharger
- Cylinders: V6
- Transmission: DC generator, single DC traction motor
- Loco brake: Straight air
Performance figures
- Power output: 600 hp (0.45 MW)
Career
- Locale: Lebanon, South Africa

The EMD GM6W diesel–electric locomotive was introduced by Electro-Motive Diesel as an export model switcher in 1960.

The prototype unit spent its entire life at the General Motors LaGrange, Illinois, plant. It wound up life at the Pielet Brothers Scrap yard next to EMD's plant and was eventually scrapped.

It inspired limited sales. Four went to the Chemin de Fer de l'Etat Libanais in Lebanon One known unit, built January 1961, was bought by the Buffelsfontein Gold Mine at Stilfontein in North West Province, South Africa.

== Original Owners ==
Railroad	Quantity	Works No.	Local Designation	Numbers	Notes
General Motors	1	24730		7037	Scrapped
Chemin de Fer de l'Etat Libanais	4	25462-65	CEL-600	601-604	
Buffelsfontein GM	1	26018		1	
