= Grand Sofar Hotel =

Lebanese former hotel

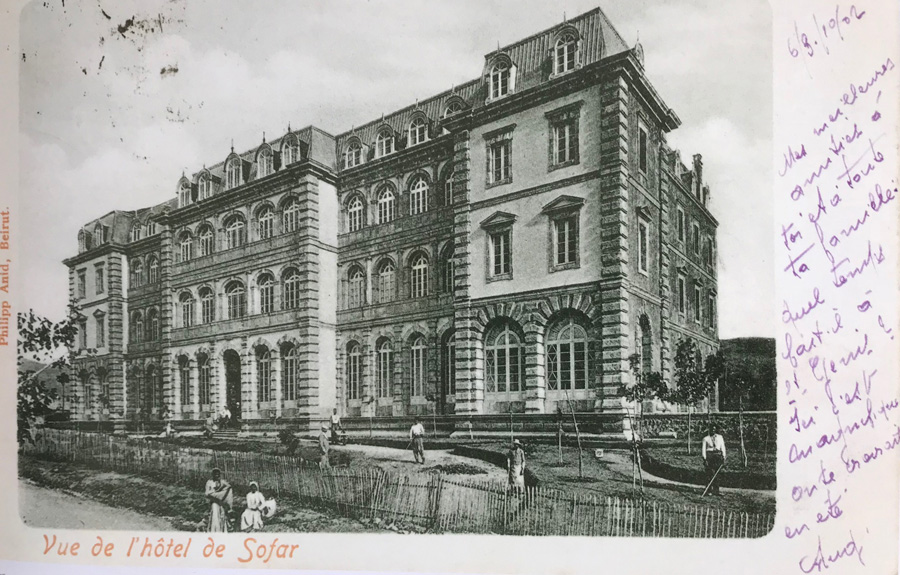
Grand Sofar Hotel

The Grand Sofar Hotel is a former hotel in Sofar, Lebanon. The hotel was built in 1892 by the Sursock family. The Arab League held their first meeting there. The hotel was seriously damaged in the Lebanese civil war. In 2018 the owner, Roderick Sursock Cochrane, reopened it as a temporary art gallery.
