= Mashriq =

Eastern part of the Arab world

Mashriq المشرق
- Countries and territories: Bahrain; Egypt; Iraq; Jordan; Kuwait; Lebanon; Oman; Palestine; Qatar; Saudi Arabia; Sudan; Syria; United Arab Emirates; Yemen
- Major regional organizations: Arab League, GCC, GAFTA, COMESA, Community of Sahel–Saharan States, Union for the Mediterranean
- Demonym: Mashriqi
- Population: 275,102,630 (2018)
- Languages: Arabic; Aramaic; Beja; Fur; Modern South Arabian (incl. Mehri); Kurdish; Nubian; Turkmen; Hebrew
- Religion: Islam, Christianity, Mandaeism, Judaism, Druze, Samaritanism, Yezidism and Alawisim

The Mashriq (/məˈʃriːk/; Arabic: ْاَلْمَشْرِق, romanized: al-Mashriq, lit. 'the east'), also known as the Arab Mashriq (Arabic: اَلْمَشْرِقُ الْعَرَبِيُّ, romanized: al-Mashriq al-ʿArabi, lit. 'the Arab east'), sometimes spelled Mashreq or Mashrek, is the eastern part of the Arab world (as opposed to the western Maghreb region), located in West Asia and eastern North Africa (Nubia). It is the Arabic equivalent for the term Middle East. Poetically the "Place of Sunrise", the name is derived from the verb sharaqa (َشَرَق, "to shine, illuminate, radiate" and "to rise"), from the sh-r-q root (ش-ر-ق), referring to the east, where the sun rises — in this regard analogous to the Latinate term "Levant".

The region includes the Arab-majority states of Bahrain, Egypt, Iraq, Jordan, Kuwait, Lebanon, Oman, Palestine, Qatar, Saudi Arabia, the Sudan, Syria, the United Arab Emirates, and Yemen.

== Geography ==
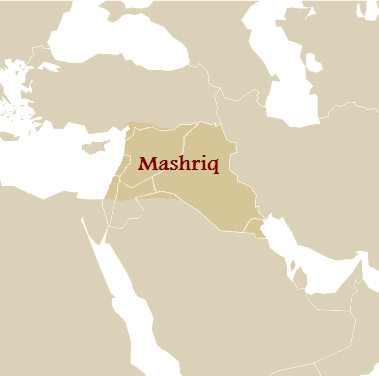
Map depicting the area most conservatively known as the Mashriq

As the word Mashriq refers to Arab countries located between the Mediterranean Sea and Iran, it is the companion term to Maghreb (Arabic: المغرب), the western half of the Arab world comprising Algeria, Morocco, Tunisia, and Libya. Libya may also be regarded as straddling the two regions. Cyrenaica in eastern Libya is considered part of the Mashriq, whereas Tripolitania in western Libya is considered part of the Maghreb. Therefore Sirtica or the Gulf of Sidra is considered the dividing point between the Maghreb and Mashreq within the Arab world.

These geographical terms date from the early Islamic expansion. The Mashriq corresponds to the Bilad al-Sham and Mesopotamian regions combined. As of 2014, the Mashriq is home to 1.7% of the global population.

== Cooperation ==
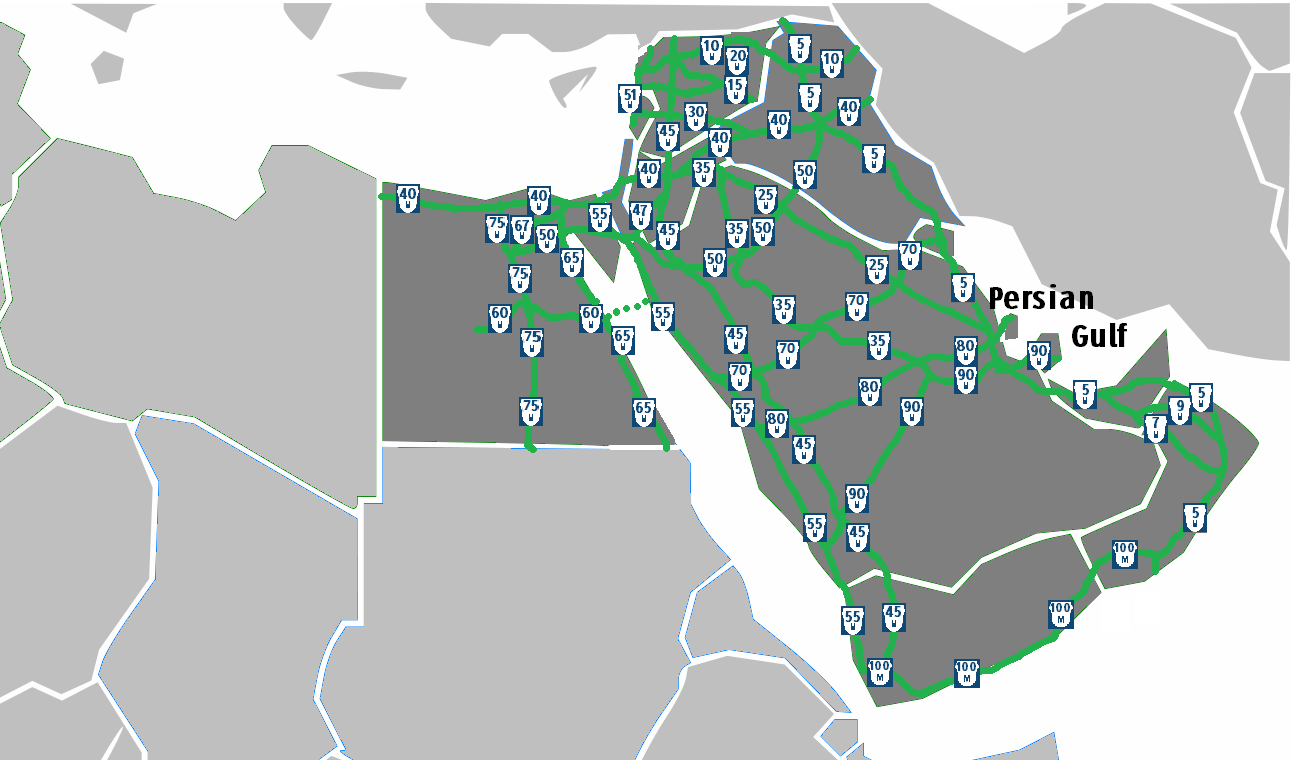
Map of the Arab Mashreq International Road Network

All of the countries located in the Arab Mashreq area are members of the Arab League, the Greater Arab Free Trade Area, and the United Nations. The region cooperates in several projects including the Arab Mashreq International Road Network and the Arab Mashreq International Railway. Several nations are also members of the GCC and others have tried to achieve political unity in the past, such as the United Arab Republic in the 1950s and 1960s, which originally included both Egypt and Syria.

== See also ==
- Arabia Felix
- Arabian Peninsula
- Cradle of civilization
- Fertile Crescent
- Levant
- Maghreb, "Place of Sunset", which contrasts with Mashriq, "Place of Sunrise"
- Mashriqi Arabic
- Mashriqi Jews
- Nile
- Shaam (Greater Syria)
