= Albert Naccache Dam =

Albred Naccache Dam
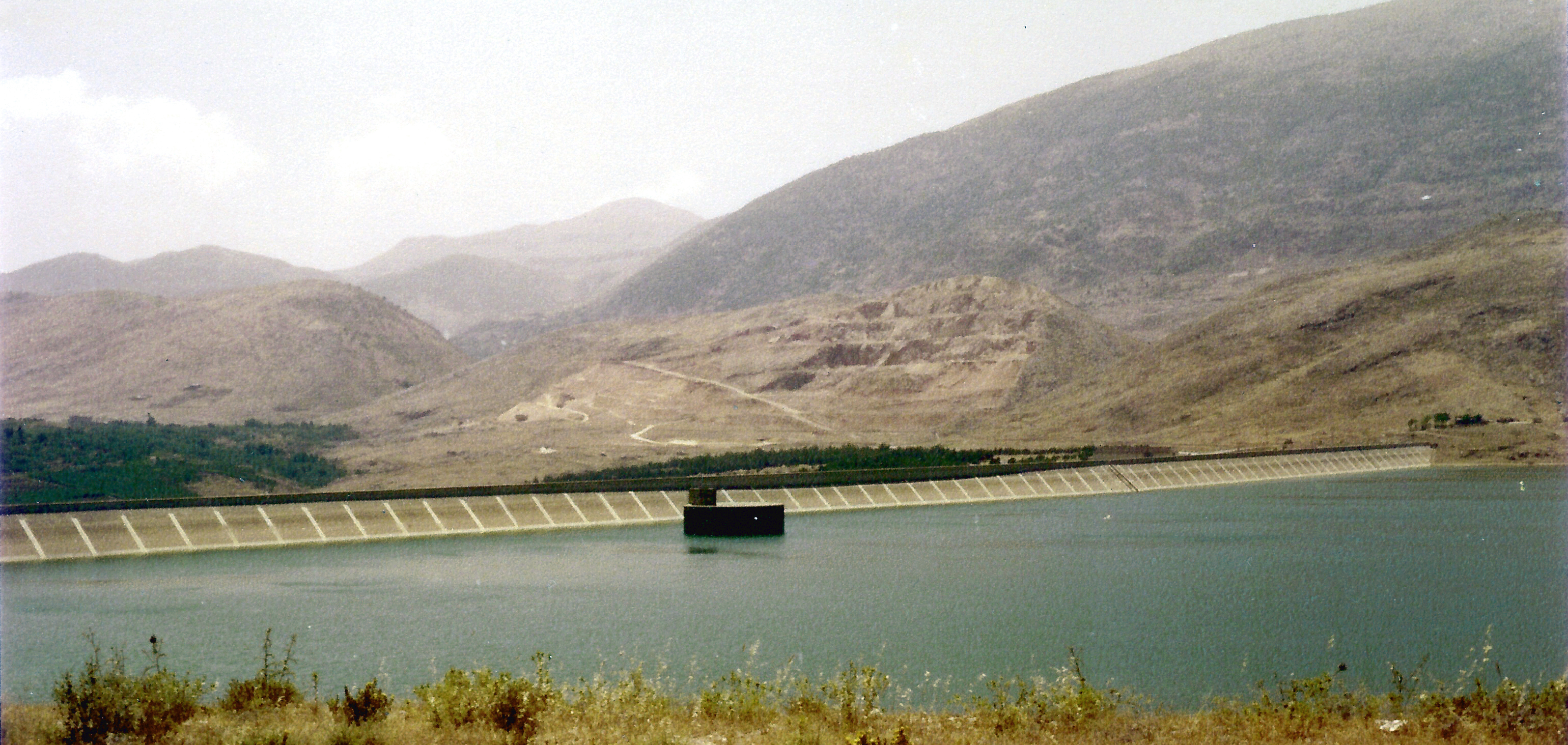
- Albred Naccache Dam

- Location within Lebanon
- Official name: سد ألبرت نقّاش
- Country: Lebanon
- Location: Western Beqaa District, Beqaa Governorate, Lebanon
- Coordinates: 33°34′21″N 35°41′51″E
- Purpose: Multi-purpose
- Status: Operational
- Construction began: 1957
- Opening date: 1959
- Construction cost: US$43.5 million
- Owner: Government of Lebanon

Dam and spillways
- Type of dam: Concrete-Faced Rockfill dam
- Impounds: Litani River
- Height (foundation): 61 m (200 ft)
- Length: 1,090 m (3,576 ft)
- Width (crest): 5 m (16 ft)
- Width (base): 162 m (531 ft)

Reservoir
- Creates: Lake Qaraoun
- Total capacity: 0.22 km3
- Active capacity: ~0.16 km3
- Inactive capacity: 0.05 km3
- Surface area: 11.09 km^{2} (4 sq mi)
- Normal elevation: 820 m (2,690 ft)

The Albert Naccache Dam (Arabic: سد ألبرت نقّاش, romanized: Sadd Albert Naccache), also commonly known as the Qaraoun dam, is a 61 m (200 ft) high and 1,090 m (3,576 ft) long concrete-faced rockfill dam (CFRD). The dam is a multipurpose structure, designed to regulate water supply for hydropower generation, domestic water supply, and irrigation, and it is the largest dam in Lebanon. The dam was completed between 1959 and 1964 as a central part of the Litani River Project, its construction led to the creation of the artificial Lake Qaraoun, which has a surface area of 11.09 km² (4.28 sq mi).

== Characteristics of the dam and the reservoir ==
The Qaraoun Dam is build across the Litani river in the southern region of the Beqaa Valley, and over karstic limestone formations. The dam is a Concrete faced rockfill Dam (CFRD), with 61 m (200 ft) in height, 1,090 m (3,576 ft) in length, it's 162 m (531 ft) wide at its Base and 5 m (16.4 ft) at its Crest, with a Crest elevation of 801 m (2,627 ft) above sea level and a Concrete Facade Area of 50,000 m².

The Reservoir has a Gross Storage Capacity of 0.22 km³ (220 million cubic meters(MCM)), with 0.16 to 0.17 km³ of Active (Live) Storage, and 0.05 km³ (50 million m³) of Dead Storage. The Reservoir has a full supply level of 858 m asl (Above sea level) and a minimum operating level of 820 m asl, with a surface area of 11.09 km² (4.28 sq mi).

=== Hydroelectric and Irrigation Output ===
The dam has a hydropower capacity of about 190 to 195 Megawatts (MW) generated across three main stations:

- Markaba Station (aka. Ibrahim Abdel Al HPP) ≈ 36 MW
- Awali Station (aka. Paul Arcashe HPP) ≈ 108 MW
- Joun Station (aka. Charles Helou HPP) ≈ 48 MW

== Drought of 2025 ==
During the year 2025, Lebanon experienced its driest winters in 40 years, which was followed by its most severe drought on record. Water availability was constrained due to rainfall dropping and reduced snowpack along with earlier melt further contributed to this constraint.

The Beqaa area of Lebanon was among the regions which were hit the hardest by the drought, approximately a quarter of wells dried and springs were depleted. Meanwhile, Lake Qaraoun recorded its lowest water inflow since its construction, falling to .045 km³ which was a wide drop compared to the annual average of 0.350 km³. In turn, that same drop resulted in the 18th- century Saghbine Bridge to reemerge as a visible marker of hydrological stress.
