= Rail transport in Lebanon =

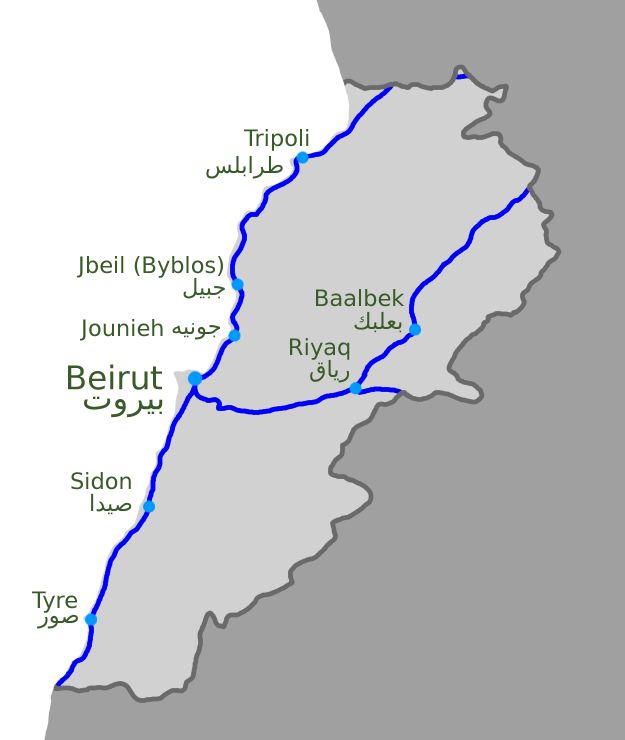
Map of the Lebanese rail network when it was in operation.

Rail transport in Lebanon began in the 1890s as French projects under the Ottoman Empire but largely ceased in the 1970s owing to the country's civil war. The last remaining routes ended for economic reasons in the 1990s. At its peak Lebanon had about 408 kilometres (254 mi) of railway.

== History ==
=== Ottoman Empire ===
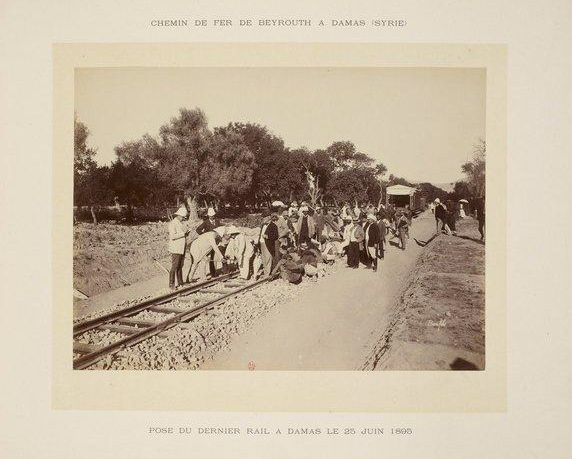
Laying the last rail of the Beirut–Damascus line on 25 June 1895. By this time, the railway had become known as the Damascus–Hama and Extensions (DHP).

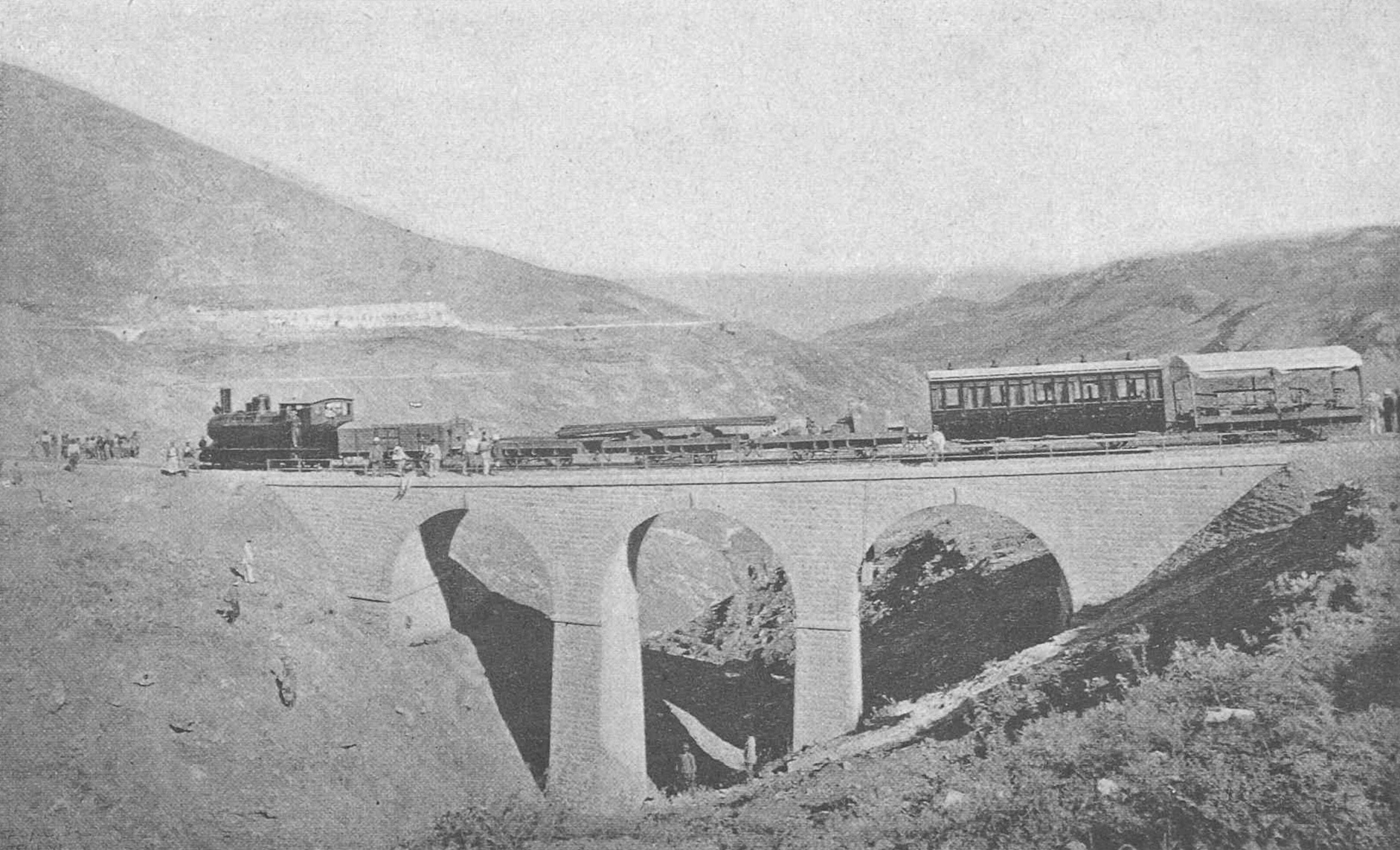
The bridge at Khan-M'rad, with a DHP train

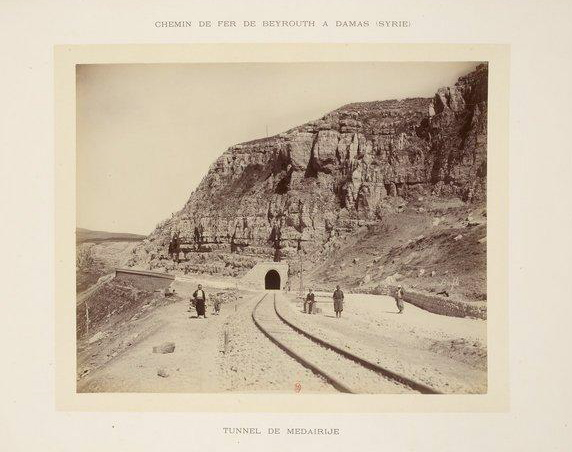
The tunnel at Medarije

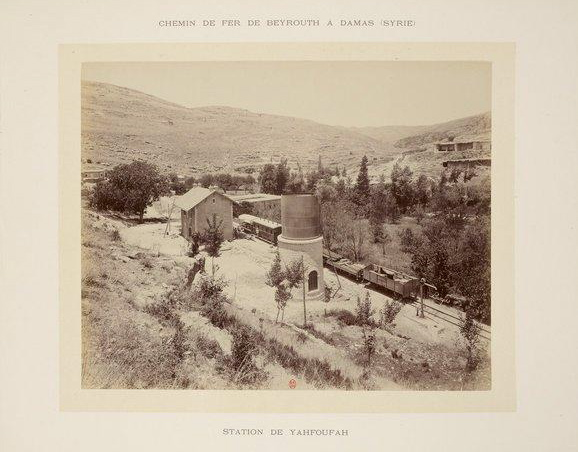
A train at Yahfufah Station

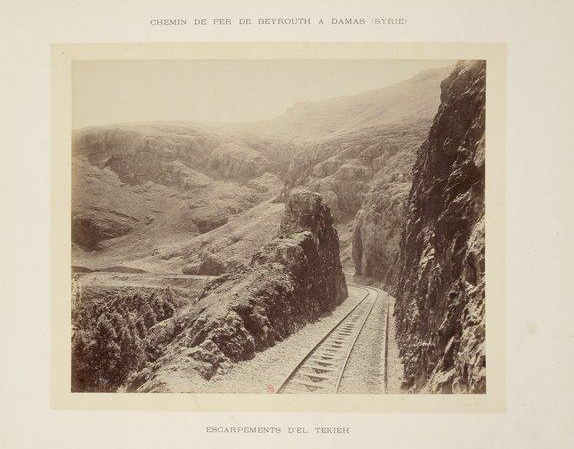
The steep incline at Tekieh

Beirut and Damascus were first connected by telegraph in 1861 and by a macadam road in 1863. Syrian railways connecting the two cities (90 mi or 140 km over the crest of the Mount Lebanon range) or another port were planned as early as 1871 but were not enacted. In 1889, the Ammiyya Revolt broke out among the Druze and other Syrian farmers. The Ottoman response to the insurrection included a number of railway concessions—quickly sold to foreign interests—to improve the development and centralized control of the region.

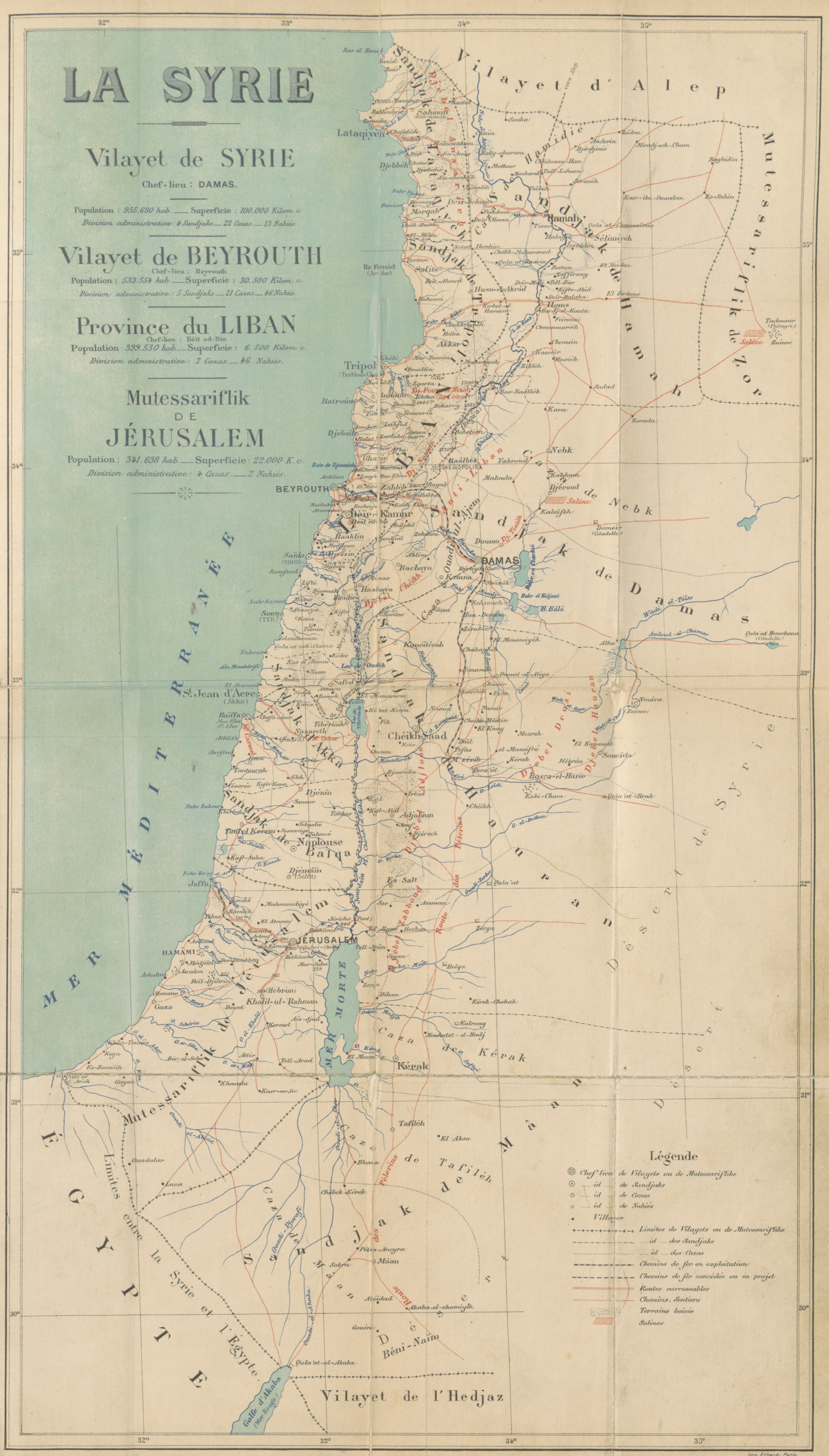
An 1896 map of Syria and Beirut, depicting the original Beirut–Damascus–Hauran Railway and planned route of the DHP

Hasan Beyhum Efendi received a concession to construct a tramway between Beirut and Damascus in 1891. Beyhum sold the concession later that year to the French Beirut–Damascus Tramway (French: Compagnie de la voie ferrée économique de Beyrouth–Damas) or Lebanon Railway, which was anxious to forestall two mooted British lines, one from Jaffa and another from Haifa, (Note: Yusuf Ilyas Efendi and Robert Philling's Syria Ottoman Railway Company, which lost its 1890 concession a year later after having failed to construct any track and ultimately was nationalized by the Ottomans in 1900 along with the British Haifa–Darʾa Railway after both ran into financial difficulties after only completing 8 km (5.0 mi) of track each.) either of which would have undercut Beirut's status as the primary port of the northern Levant. In the event, the Jaffa line was never extended towards Damascus and the Haifa line ran out of money having completed just 8 km (5.0 mi) or 21 mi (34 km) of track.

Around the same time, the French Damascus Tramways (Compagnie des tramways de Damas et voies ferrées économiques de Syrie) or Belgian Syrian Railway (Chemin de fer en Syrie) purchased another native's concession for the 65 mi (105 km) Damascus–Muzeirib Railway. The Hauran around Muzeirib is Syria's breadbasket and the town also served as the point of departure for pilgrim caravans during the Hajj.

The two lines quickly merged as the Société des Chemins de fer Ottomans économiques de Beyrouth–Damas–Hauran or Société des chemins de fer ottomans economiques de Beyrouth–Havran, with its headquarters in Constantinople (Istanbul) and an office in Paris. It originally planned to use a meter gauge but ended with a 1,050 mm (3 ft 5 11/32 in) gauge, along with expensive Abt rack sections to deal with the Mount Lebanon range. It ran through the Dar al-Beida Pass, with the summit at Beidar (37 km or 23 mi from Beirut) 1,487 m or 4,879 ft above sea level. The railway completed its port at Beirut in December 1892.

In 1893, the company received a concession for a line from Damascus to Al-Bireh in the Northern Levant, which prompted its name to be changed to the Damascus–Hama Railway or Damascus–Hama and Extensions (Société Ottomane du Chemins de fer de Damas-Hamah et Prolongements, DHP; Turkish: Şam–Hama ve Temdidi Osmanlı Demiryolu Şirketi). The network is also known as the Syrian Railways in English. The initial concession was later emended to link the two lines at Riyaq instead of Damascus. Service from Damascus south to Muzeirib began in July 1894 (in time for that year's harvest) and to Beirut on 3 August 1895. The trip from the coast to Damascus initially took 9 hours and terminated at three different stations: Baramke Station, Qanawat Station, and Midan Station. Between 1900 and 1908, the separate Hejaz Railway (HRR) (Note: The Hejaz Railway was also an Ottoman response to a local uprising: in its case, the Hauran Uprising of 1898.) expanded from Damascus south to Medina, with a branch to Haifa opened in 1906. The HRR was built to a 1.05-meter gauge to match the Beirut–Damascus Railway and absorbed both the former British concession and the DHP's line south from Damascus.)

Wheat from the Hauran—high-protein semolina used in pasta—was intended to be the mainstay of the railway's income, along with the Muslim pilgrimage trade during the Hajj. The entry of American, Indian, and Australian wheat into the European market amid the continuing Long Depression, however, undercut that trade while the railway was still under construction. Damascene traders had thought the Beirut railway would allow them to export their grain more cheaply; instead, as early as the 1894 harvest, the rail flooded the market, collapsing prices and margins. Completion of the line to the coast did not improve matters, since the world market was trading at still lower prices and the premium once commanded by Hauran wheat—which, being hand-harvested, might include pebbles or weeds—was now lost to machine-reaped grain from the United States. It was not until 1908 that export values again reached the levels of the 1880s. The railway itself was one of the best-managed in the Ottoman Empire: It had total receipts of $434,000 for 1900 and in 1906 received a guarantee from the government of $4320 per mile on the 200-mile Aleppo Railway All the same, the company was never very profitable: it was at perpetual risk of bankruptcy; shares traded at 550 Fr in 1891 and only 468 Fr in 1909; and dividends were minuscule: 4.40 Fr in 1902 and 6.31 Fr in 1909.

A 1911 map of Turkey in Asia depicting the DHP's northward extension to Aleppo and the HRR's parallel track through the Hauran

The line suffered a serious accident at Aley on 12 April 1904. Aley had grown with the railroad and functioned as a summer resort for the people of Beirut. Part of the locomotive exploded on the 7% incline east of town and, not thinking to apply the brakes, the train was allowed to fly back through the station. Two cars were completely destroyed upon the rocks on the other side, killing 8 and seriously injuring 21.

The Aleppo Railway via the Beqaa Valley between the Mount Lebanon range and the Anti-Lebanon Mountains was built to standard gauge. As a result, traffic between the two lines had to be transferred at Riyaq. The line opened as far as Baalbek on 19 June 1902 and began service to Aleppo on 4 October 1906. The Baghdad Railway reached Aleppo in 1912, connecting the line with Istanbul.

The concession for the Tripoli–Saida line was purchased from its original holder, a Syrian, by the French Société ottomane des libanais nord et sud de Beyrouth. By 1898, it had only laid 19 km (12 mi) of track and the DHP's concession was emended to permit a branch line to Tripoli. This was eventually extended northward to reconnect with the Aleppo Railway at Homs, beginning service in 1911. During the First World War, however, its track was removed for use elsewhere.

A separate 1,050 mm (3 ft 5 11/32 in)-gauge coastal railway, the Lebanese Tramway (Tramway Libanais) began service in 1895 and reached Maameltein in 1908.

During the First World War, the Ottoman Empire seized control of all foreign-owned railways in the country, including the DHP. The entire Hauran line was disassembled to extend the Palestine Railways toward the Suez Canal.

Thus, by the beginning of World War One the Ottomans - through foreign investment and oversight - had railways connecting Beirut, Tripoli, Homs, Hamah, Jaffa, Haifa, Nusaybin, Daraa, Aleppo, Istanbul, Medina.

=== French Mandate ===
The CIWL's Taurus Express network c. 1930.

Following the First World War, France held the mandate for Syria and Lebanon under the auspices of the League of Nations. The DHP's ownership of its track was reinstated and it was also given control of the Hejaz Railway. Competition between the French port at Beirut and the British one at Haifa led to tariff wars and, in 1921, land swaps in Palestine for Syrian railway rights.

From around 1930, the Aleppo Railway formed a stage on the Taurus Express's southern route to Cairo. An alternate route ran along the Tripoli line to Beirut. The service was operated by the Compagnie Internationale des Wagons-Lits and was discontinued in 1972. In 1933, the Syrian Lines to Baghdad (Lignes Syriennes de Baghdad) arranged the Baghdad Railway as a subsidiary of the DHP.

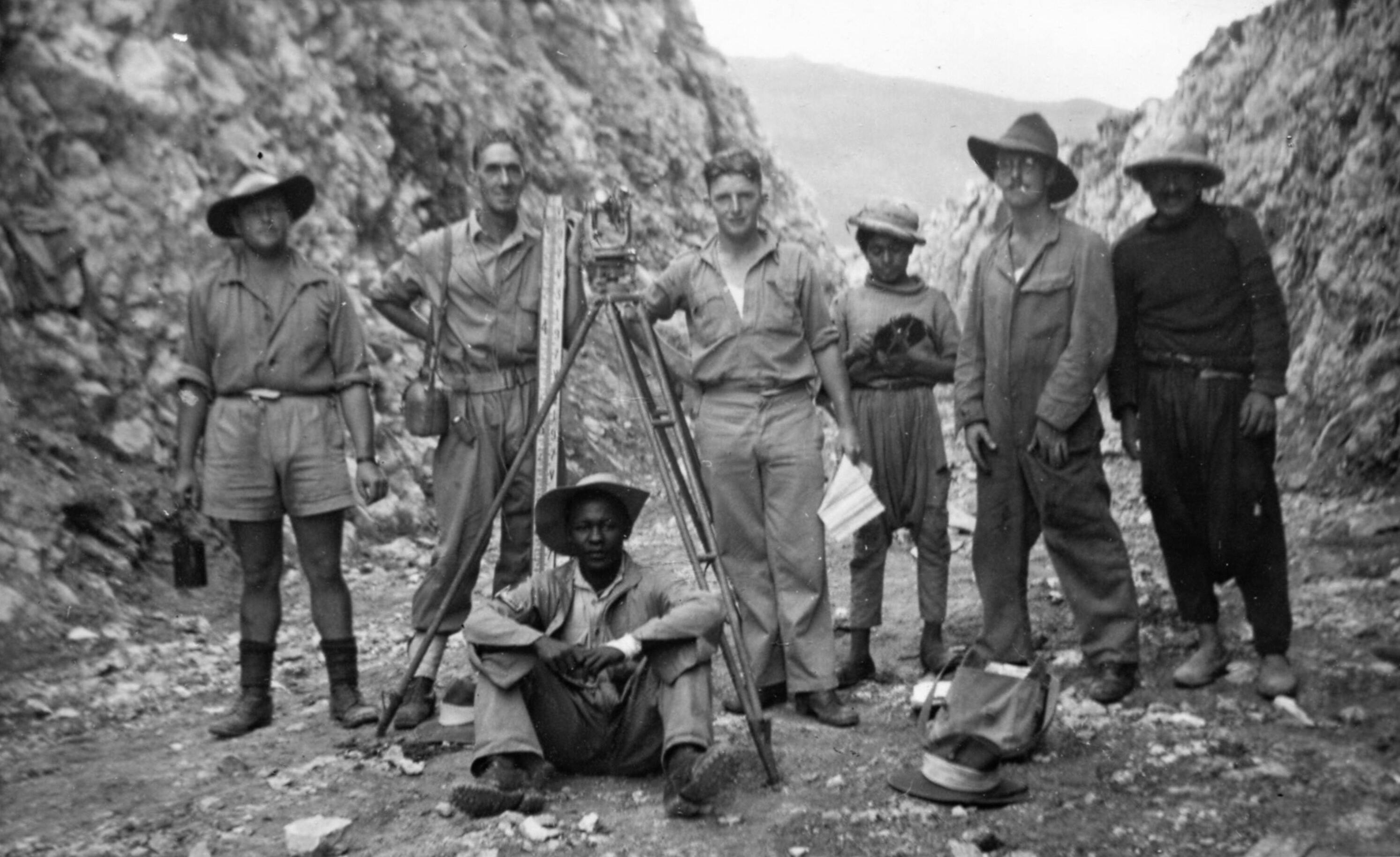
Australian Army engineers, an African Auxiliary Pioneer Corps serviceman and Lebanese workers during the cutting at Maameltein, 1942

The railways saw significant use in the Second World War. The British originally planned to connect their standard-gauge network from Haifa to Riyaq but gave up the project in 1941 as too difficult. Instead, engineers from South Africa and Australia completed a standard-gauge line along the coast between Haifa and Beirut by 24 August 1942 and expanded this to Tripoli Railway Station by 18 December 1942. This Haifa–Beirut–Tripoli Railway (HBT) was the last link connecting the European and North African standard-gauge rail networks, apart from the ferry across the Bosphorus at Istanbul, but it never operated for civilian use. Instead, the British maintained it under the control of their military as late as February 1948, when the Jewish insurgency in Palestine destroyed the bridges near the tunnels at Ras al-Nakura. An earlier attempt by Haganah forces to attack the HBT in two places near Nahal Kziv during the Night of the Bridges in 1946 was unsuccessful. Nowadays the only portion of the HBT still in operation is the Coastal Railway between Nahariya and Haifa in northern Israel.

=== Independent Lebanon ===
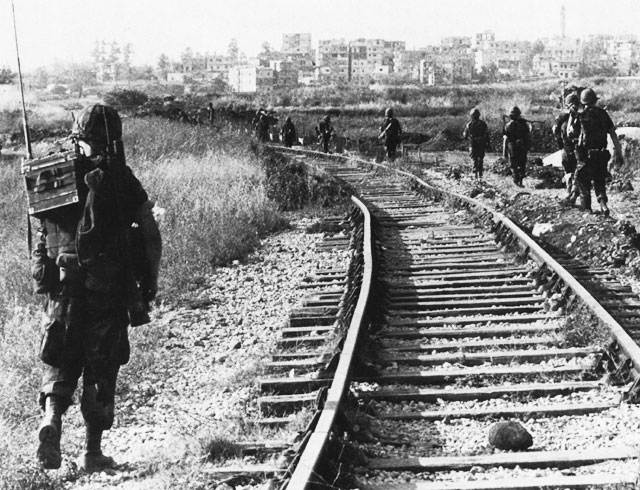
United States Marines patrol a CEL railway as part of the Multinational Force in Lebanon in August 1983

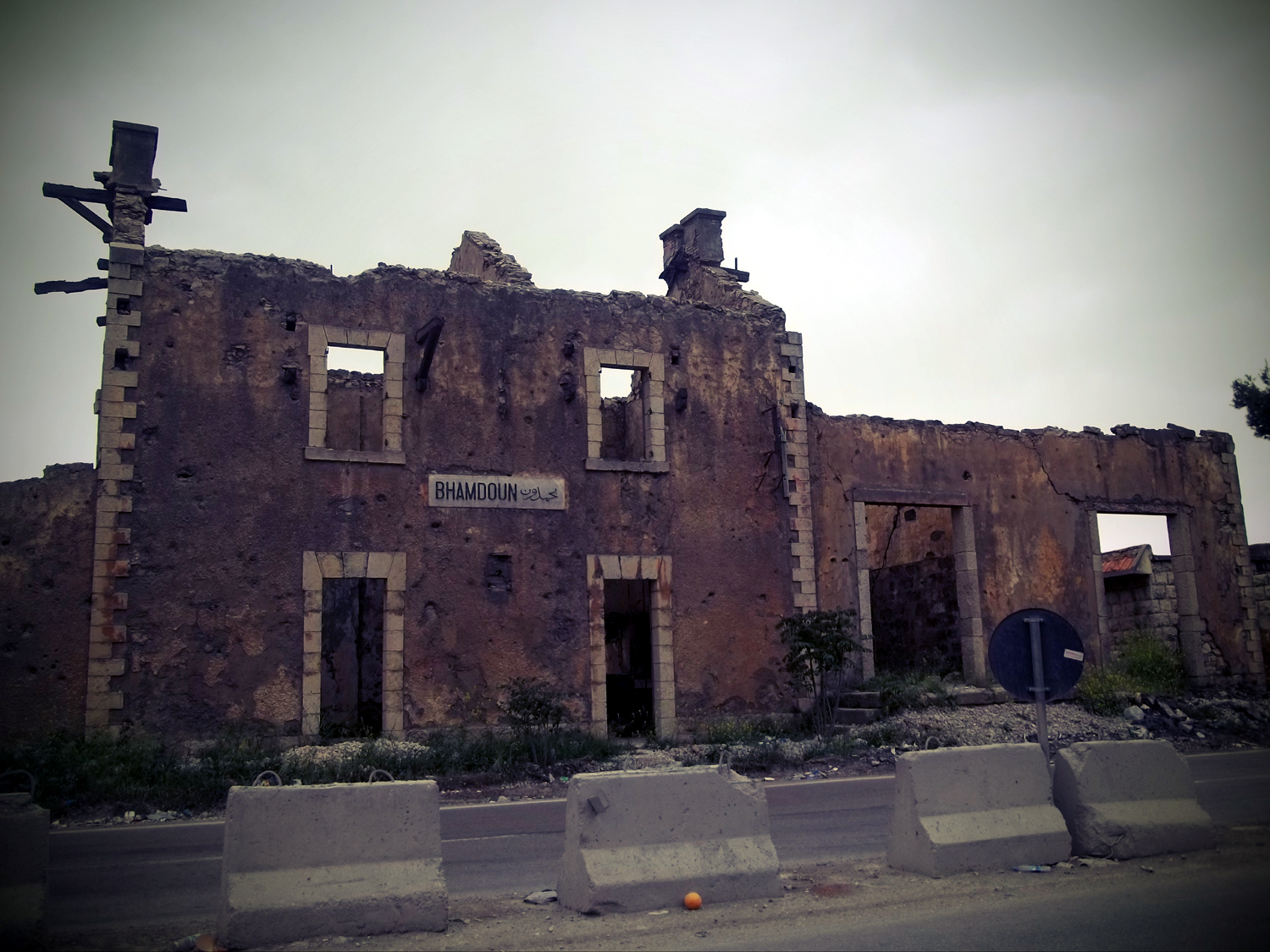
Ruin of the train station in Bhamdoun (2012)

General Georges Catroux proclaimed the independence of Lebanon in 1941 but the French did not actually permit local rule until 1943. In 1946, the Lebanese government bought the Naqoura–Tripoli Railway for £5 000 000, yielding its management to DHP. Syria nationalized its own railways in 1956 as CFS (Syrian Railways). In 1960 or 1961, the country's network was reorganized as the Lebanese Railway (Chemin de fer de l'État Libanais, CEL). The Lebanese Civil War caused considerable damage to the rail network, however, and services gradually ceased. During the civil war, damage was caused by militias who blew up the tracks, Israeli army shelling and Syrian security forces digging up parts of the track to sell as scrap metal in Pakistan. A 1974 article revealed that the 1.05-m DHP system was still working but still using steam power, uncompetitive and loss making. The line between Beirut and Damascus was closed in 1976. Commuter service between Dora and Byblos ceased in 1993 and the last regular rail operations in Lebanon—trains carrying cement from Chekka to Beirut—ended in 1997. The Polish diesel locomotive class SP45 for this line continued to be run once a month at the Furn el Shebbak stockyards as late as 2002, but service was not resumed.

== Syria ==
Only a very short length of the Syrian Homs-Tartus line crosses the border into Lebanon. This happens because the railway was built before this border was defined. While today in Syria, all 1,435 mm (4 ft 8 1/2 in) network and trains are operated by CFS (Syrian Railways).

=== Background on trains from Istanbul to Syria: A brief history of the Taurus Express ===
Agatha Christie wrote the first part of her novel Murder on the Orient Express during her stay in room 203 in Baron Hotel in Aleppo. The novel doesn't start in Istanbul, or on the Orient Express. It opens on the platform at Aleppo, next to the two blue-and-gold Wagons-Lits sleeping cars of the Taurus Express bound for Istanbul. The Taurus Express was inaugurated in February 1930 by the Compagnie Internationale des Wagons-Lits, the same company that operated the Orient Express and Simplon Orient Express, as a means of extending their services beyond Istanbul to the East. It ran several times a week from Istanbul Haydarpaşa station to Aleppo and Baghdad, with a weekly through sleeper to Tripoli in Lebanon. After World War II, the Wagons-Lits company gradually withdrew and operation of the Taurus Express was taken over by the Turkish, Syrian and Iraqi state railways. Up until the late 1980s, a twice-weekly Istanbul-Baghdad service was maintained, with weekly through seating cars from Istanbul to Aleppo. For political reasons, the through service to Baghdad was suspended and the main train curtailed at Gaziantep, but the weekly through seat cars Istanbul-Aleppo were maintained. In 2001, the Aleppo portion of the Toros Express was upgraded to a Syrian sleeping-car replacing the two basic Turkish seat cars.

Trains functioning in Syria:

- LDE DE (Diesel-electric)
- DMU-5 DH (Diesel-hydraulic): Multiple units from Hyundai Rotem, Korea for Aleppo-Damascus/Latakia long-distance services. 222-second class, 61 first class.

Networks:

- Damascus - Homs - Hamah - Aleppo - Maydan Ikbis (- Ankara, Istanbul, Turkey TCDD)
- Aleppo (- Gaziantep, Turkey TCDD)
- Aleppo - Latakia - Tartus - Al Akkari - Homs
- Homs - Palmyra: freight only, opened for phosphates traffic, destined for the port of Tartus, in 1980
- Line runs from the oilfields of Al Qamishli in the north to the port of Latakia (750 km)
- Al Akkari (- Tripoli CEL, out of use)
- Aleppo - Deir ez-Zor - Al-Qamishli (- Nusaybin, Turkey TCDD)
- Extension from Homs southwards to Damascus (194 km) was opened in 1983
- 80 km (50 mi) Tartus-Latakia line in 1992
- Al Qamishli - Al-Yaarubiyah (- IRR Iraq, out of use)
- Damascus - Sheikh Miskin - Dera'a: under construction, to replace a section of Hejaz railway
- Sheikh Miskin - Suwayda (under construction)
- Palmyra - Deir ez-Zor - Abu Kemal (- IRR Iraq) (planned)

== Israel ==
Israel's national railway operator, Israel Railways, has planned a rail link from Lebanon to its own network, branching off the Haifa-Karmiel railway in Ahihud. These plans are unlikely to materialize given the absence of diplomatic relations between the two countries.

Trains functioning in Israel:

- Siemens Desiro HC (Electric)
- Bombardier Double-Deck Coach (Electric and Diesel-electric)

Networks:

- Beersheba - Kiryat Gat - Ramla - Lod - Tel Aviv - Herzliya - Haifa - Nahariya
- Beersheba - Kiryat Gat - Ramla - Lod - Tel Aviv - Herzliya - Hadera - Haifa - Karmiel
- Modi'in - Ben Gurion Airport - Tel Aviv - Binyamina - Haifa - Nahariya
- Jerusalem - Ben Gurion Airport - Tel Aviv - Herzliya
- Atlit - Haifa - Afula - Beit She'an
- Beersheba - Netivot - Ashkelon - Lod - Tel Aviv - Herzliya - Netanya - Hadera - Binyamina
- Ashkelon - Rishon LeZiyyon - Tel Aviv - Rosh Ha'Ayin - Kfar Saba - Herzliya
- Beit Shemesh - Ramla - Lod - Tel Aviv - Herzliya - Netanya
- Beersheba - Dimona
- Beersheba - Ramat Hovev (freight only)
- Beersheba - Dimona - Rotem (freight only)
- Ashkelon - Kiryat Gat (freight only)
- Rosh Ha'Ayin - Lod (freight only)
- Hadera - Kfar Saba - Rosh Ha'Ayin - Lod (under construction)
- Rishon LeZiyyon - Modi'in (under construction)

== Rolling stock ==
=== Retired ===
Class	Image	Axle Formula	Number	Year in Service	Power [kW]	Constructor	Notes
Uerdingen railbus			12				Former German railbuses, in 1982–83 acquired from DB via MAS. Last one delivered in 1986–87. Apparently all destroyed during Lebanese Civil War. 798 672-2 > A 10450; 998 143-2 > B 10450; 998 771-0 > C 10450; 798 789-4 > A 10451; 998 032-7 > B 10451; 998 876-7 > C 10451; 798 707-6 > A 10452; 998 010-3 > B 10452; 998 672-0 > C 10452; 798 708-4 > A 10453; 998 153-1 > B 10453; 998 862-7 > C 10453

== Planned revival ==
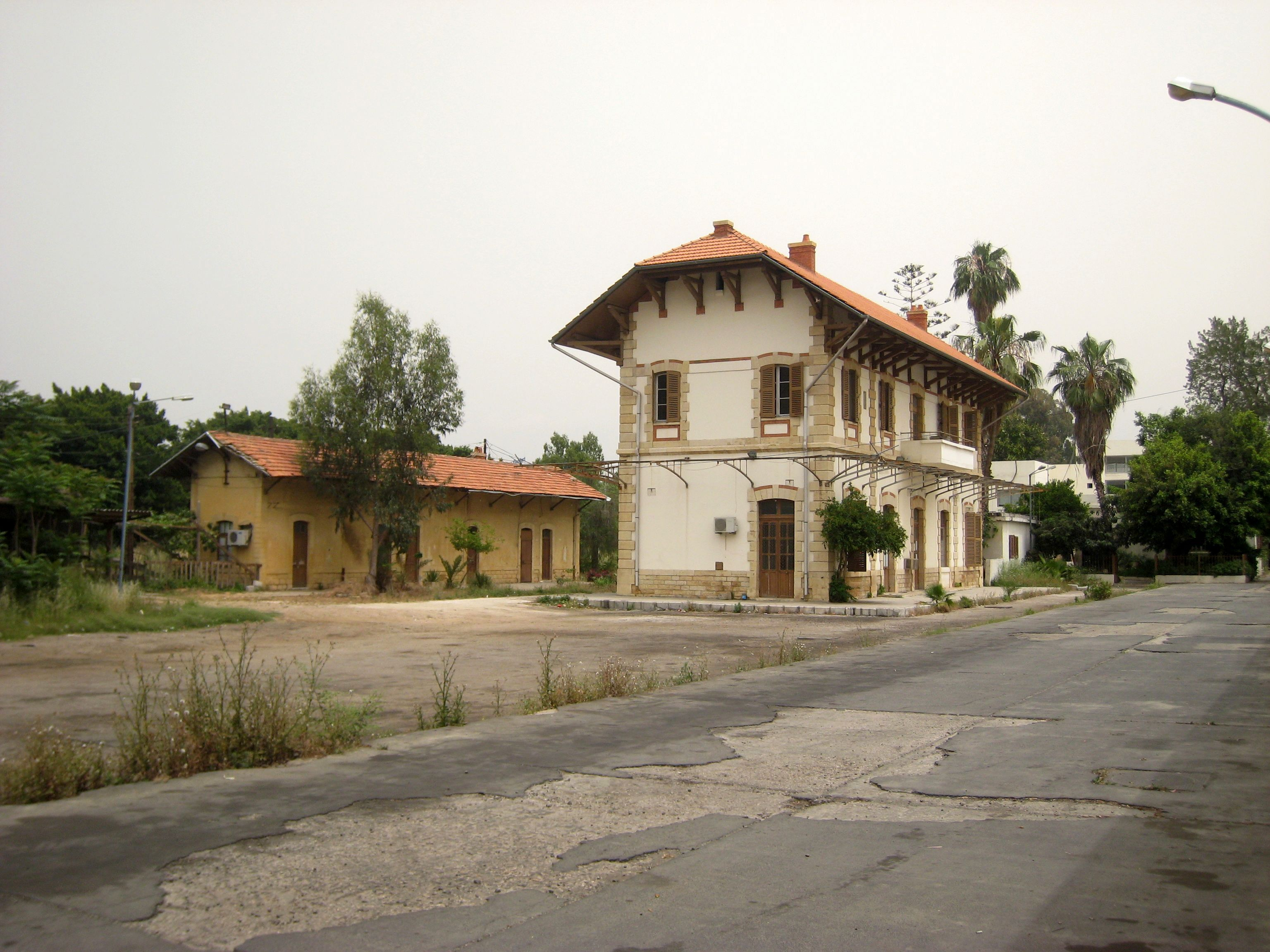
Beirut Railway Station in 2007

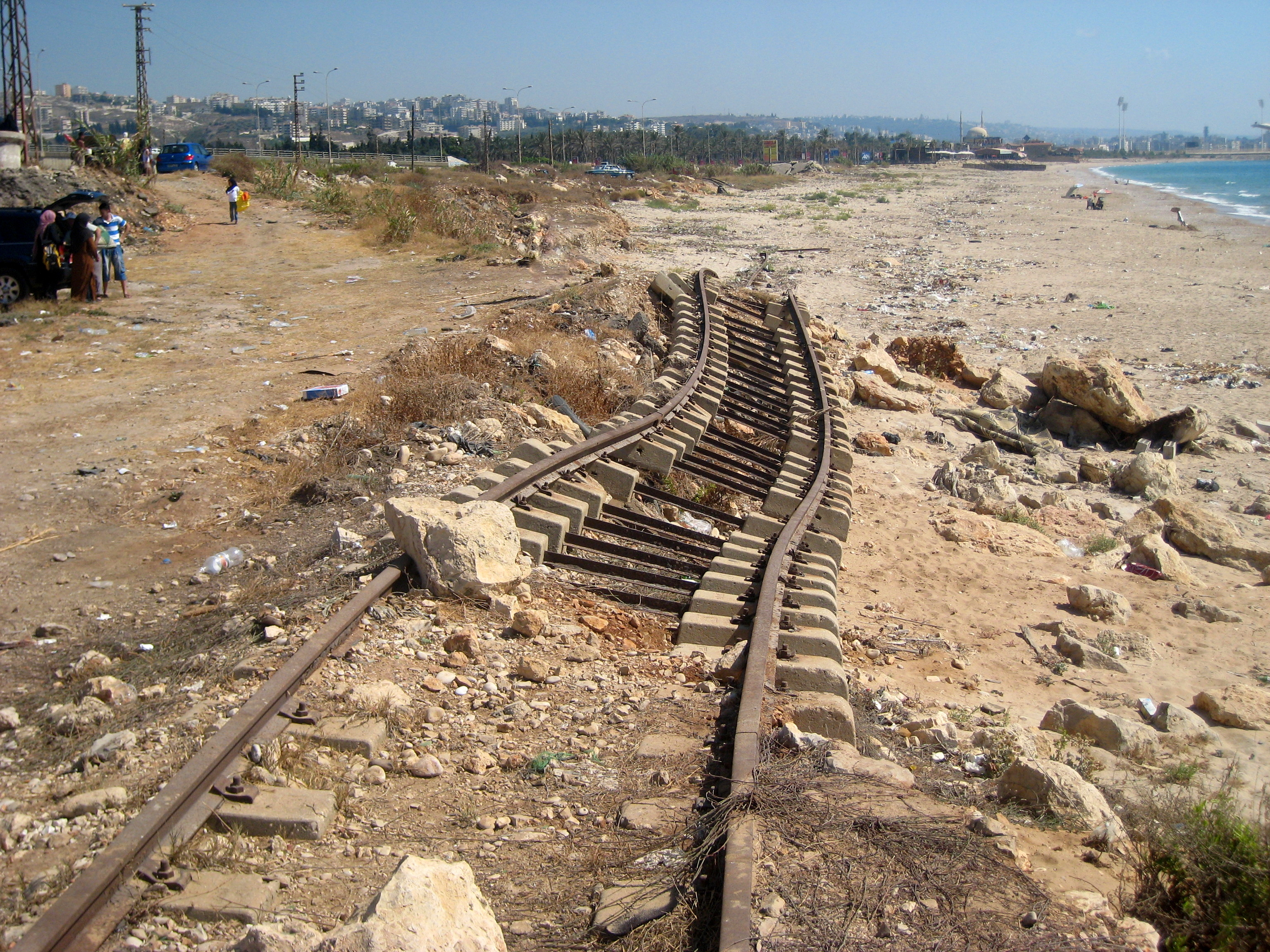
The railway at Saïda in 2007

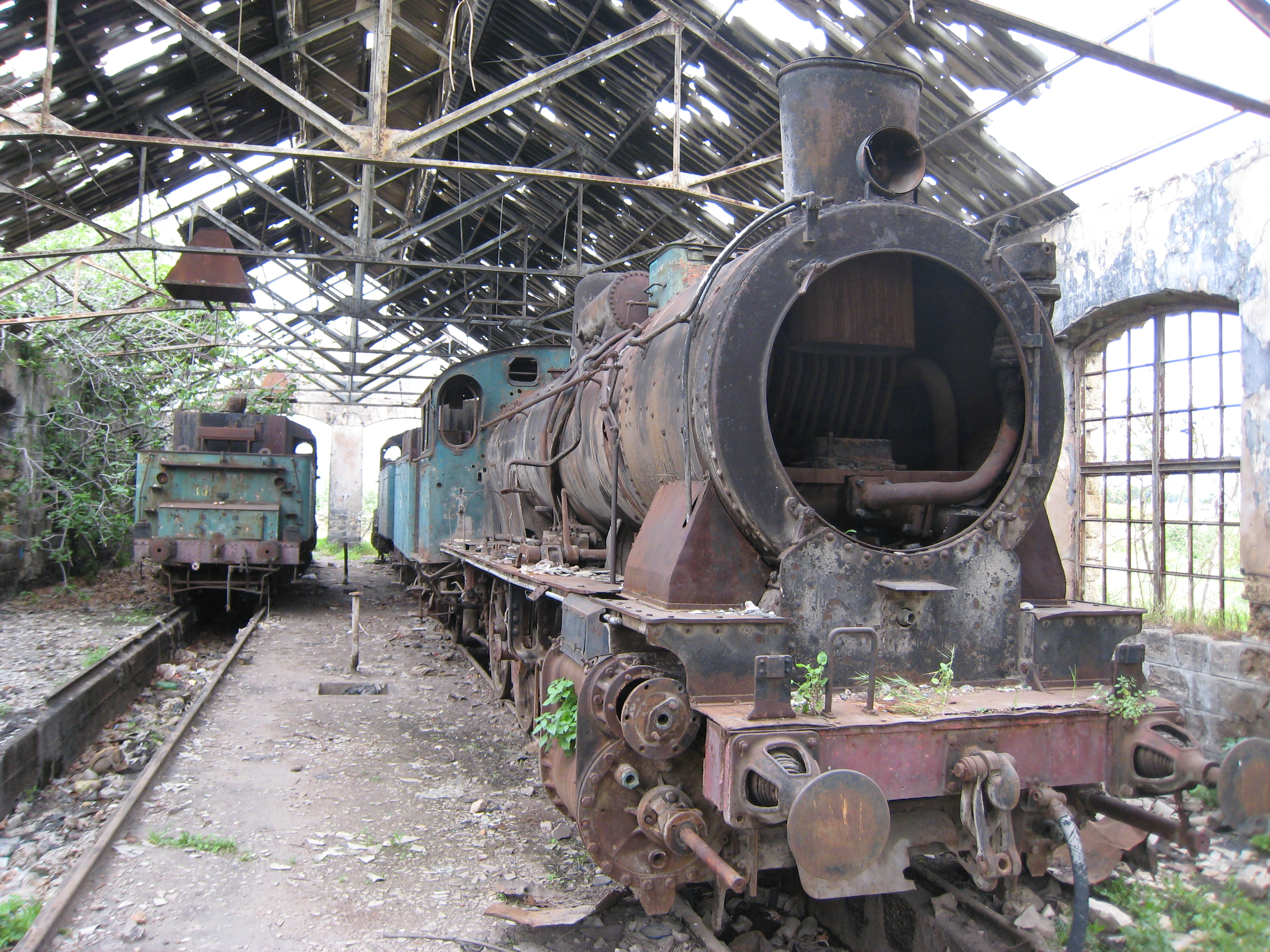
A Lebanese locomotive at Tripoli in 2007

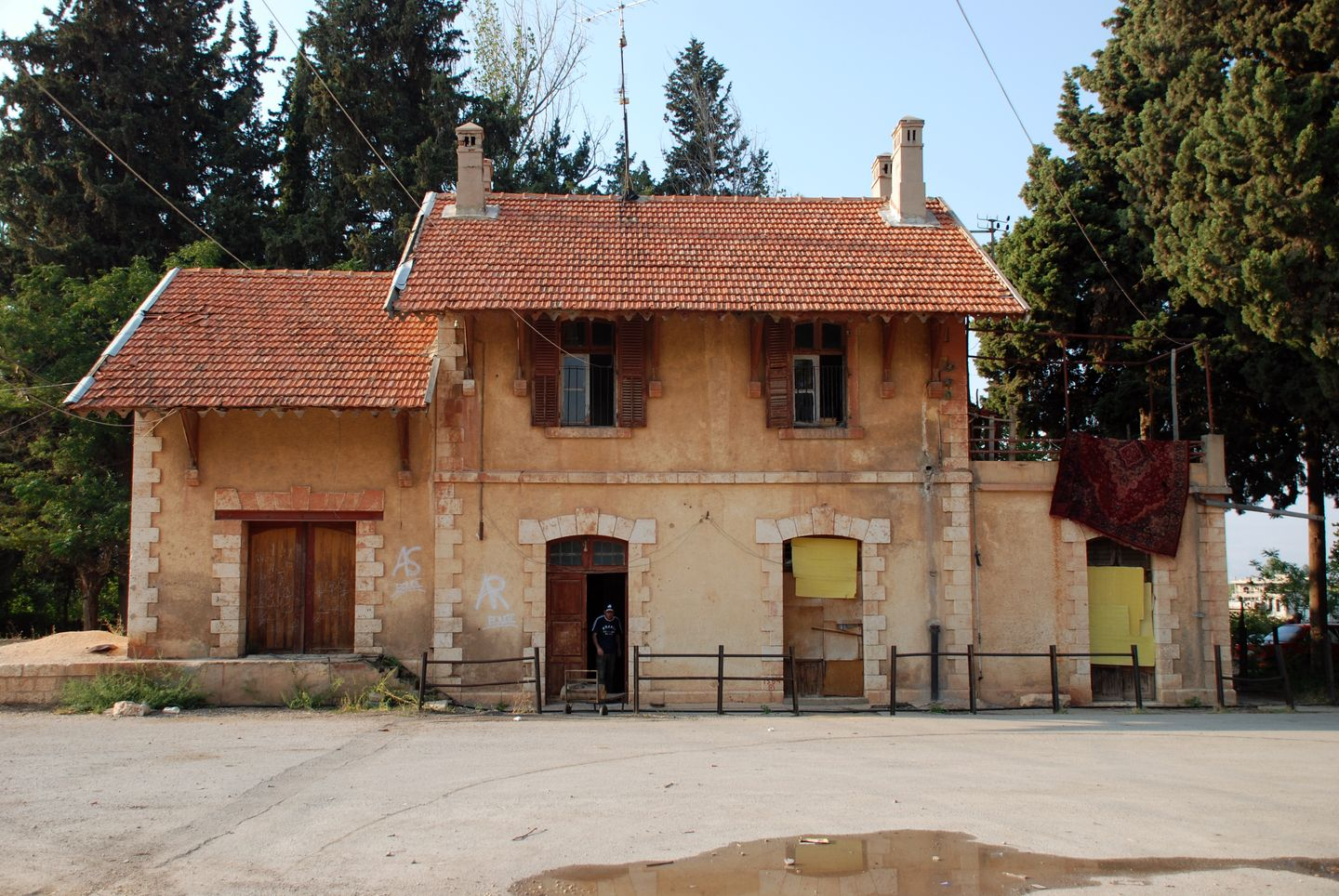
Baalbek Railway Station in 2009

There have been a number of proposals for reviving the Lebanese railway system, but as yet, none have come to fruition. One such planned revival is being led by Elias Maalouf, founder of the Lebanese NGO, Train Train. Maalouf is planning to relaunch the line between the coastal cities of Byblos and Batroun, to show the feasibility of having trains running again. The project, with a budget of £430,000, should take only a matter of months to complete, but as of 2014, Maalouf was still waiting for the green light from the Lebanese government.

According to a study funded by the European Investment Bank, a railway line connecting Beirut to Tripoli would cost $3 billion to build, while a freight railway from Tripoli to Homs would cost much less. However, efforts to revive Lebanon's railway system have been stymied by the Syrian Civil War.

In 2011, Dr. Maroun Kassab, an architect and assistant professor, proposed a coastal metro system that can capitalize on the existing lands owned by the ministry and that can run underground from Tyr to Tripoli.

In February 2022 media reported a proposed Spanish grant for the reestablishment of Lebanese railways.

== See also ==
- Beirut Tramway
- Syrian railways
- Transport in Syria
- Arab Mashreq International Railway
- Palestine Railways
- Tripoli Railway Station
- OCFTC, Lebanon's public transport operator
- AS DPHB, the defunct football club of the Lebanese railways
