= Beirut railway station =

Former railway station in Beirut, Lebanon

Beirut Beyrouth
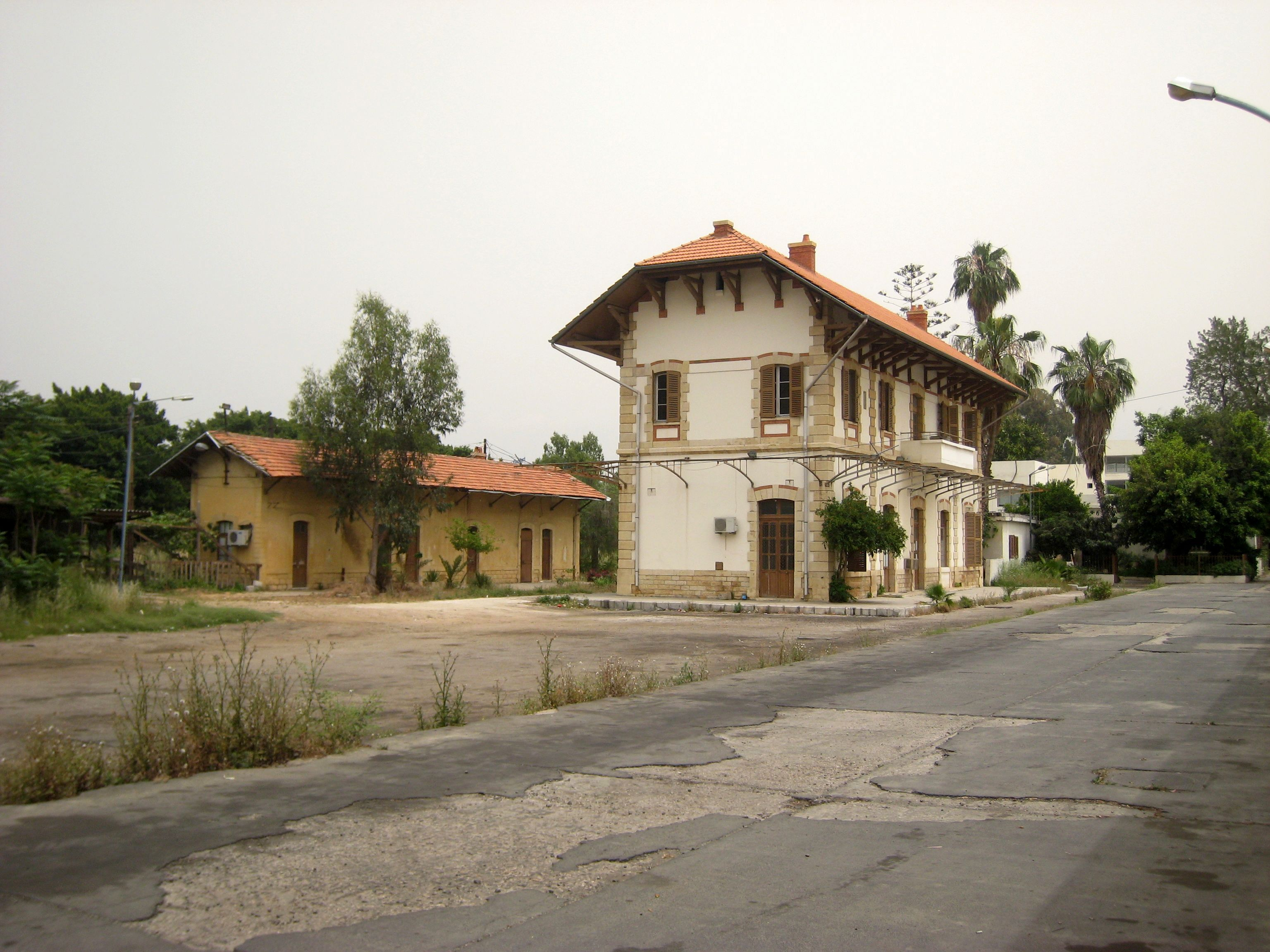
- The former station in 2007

General information
- Location: Lebanon
- Operator: Société Ottomane du Chemins de fer de Damas-Hamah et Prolongements (DHP)

Construction
- Architectural style: French architectural style

History
- Opened: 1895
- Closed: 1975/1976
Location

The Beirut Railway Station is a former passenger railway station, located in the Mar Mikhaël district of Beirut, Lebanon. Situated along two railway lines, it opened in 1895 and operated until it was closed in 1975 due to the Lebanese Civil War. In addition to the passenger station building, the 62.000 square metre facility also had a repair shop and rail yard.

== Historical Information ==
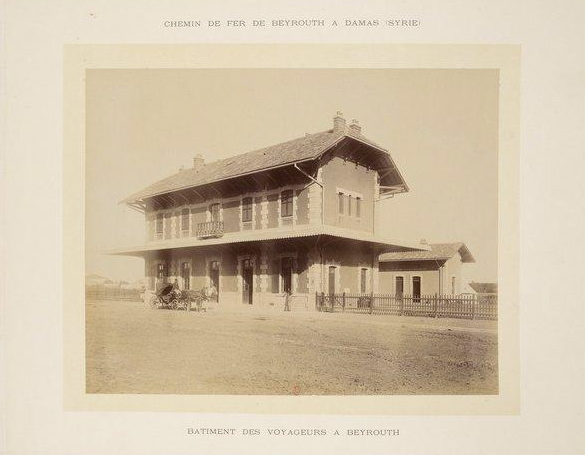
View of the station, circa 1895.

The station was built by the Société de Construction des Batignolles during the Ottoman era and is located along two main railway lines; the first, a cogwheel track from Beirut to Damascus opened in 1895, while the second line, known as the NBT line (Naqoura, Beirut, Tripoli), was opened in 1942 and followed the coast to Palestine.

The station building was constructed in a French architectural style with 5 meter high ceilings and a station clock by famous clock-maker Paul Garnier. Trains arrived at the station along one of three platforms. The station clock is set by means of a crank and can operate for 16 days; as of 2011, it was still keeping time. The first train to Riyaq left the station in 1895, arriving at its destination nine hours later.

Blueprints for the station (dated from 1891) have been preserved by the Lebanese University in Beirut and are available online. Per the university, the passenger station last served clients in 1976.

The abandoned station has been used for cultural events and fund-raisers in the 21st Century. In 2014, the station building was converted into a trendy outdoor bar, with an abandoned steam locomotive on site used as a DJ booth. Many young patrons of the establishment are not even aware the building was a train station, thinking it was simply an industrial-style décor used at the site.

The station was heavily damaged in the 2020 Beirut explosion, particularly along the roof of the building.

In July 2023, UNESCO and Italy signed an agreement to finance the reconstruction of the Beirut Mar Mikhael Train Station with a budget of €2 million.
