= Beirut Tramway =

Beirut maintained a public tramway from the early to mid 20th century. The first tramline was developed under the Ottoman rule and continued operation under the French Mandate up to the 1960s, as modern automobiles became widely adopted. With the problem of congestion and severe traffic jams caused by the explosion of cars in the Beirut Metropolitan area, trams have been proposed as a possible solution.

== History ==
The tramway system in Beirut opened in April 1908 and lasted until September 1965. The golden age of the Beirut Tram saw it cover 12 Kilometers around Beirut's center in 1931. As automobiles became more widely adopted, tram tracks were removed to give way for more cars until the tram was fully decommissioned in September 1968.

== Gallery ==
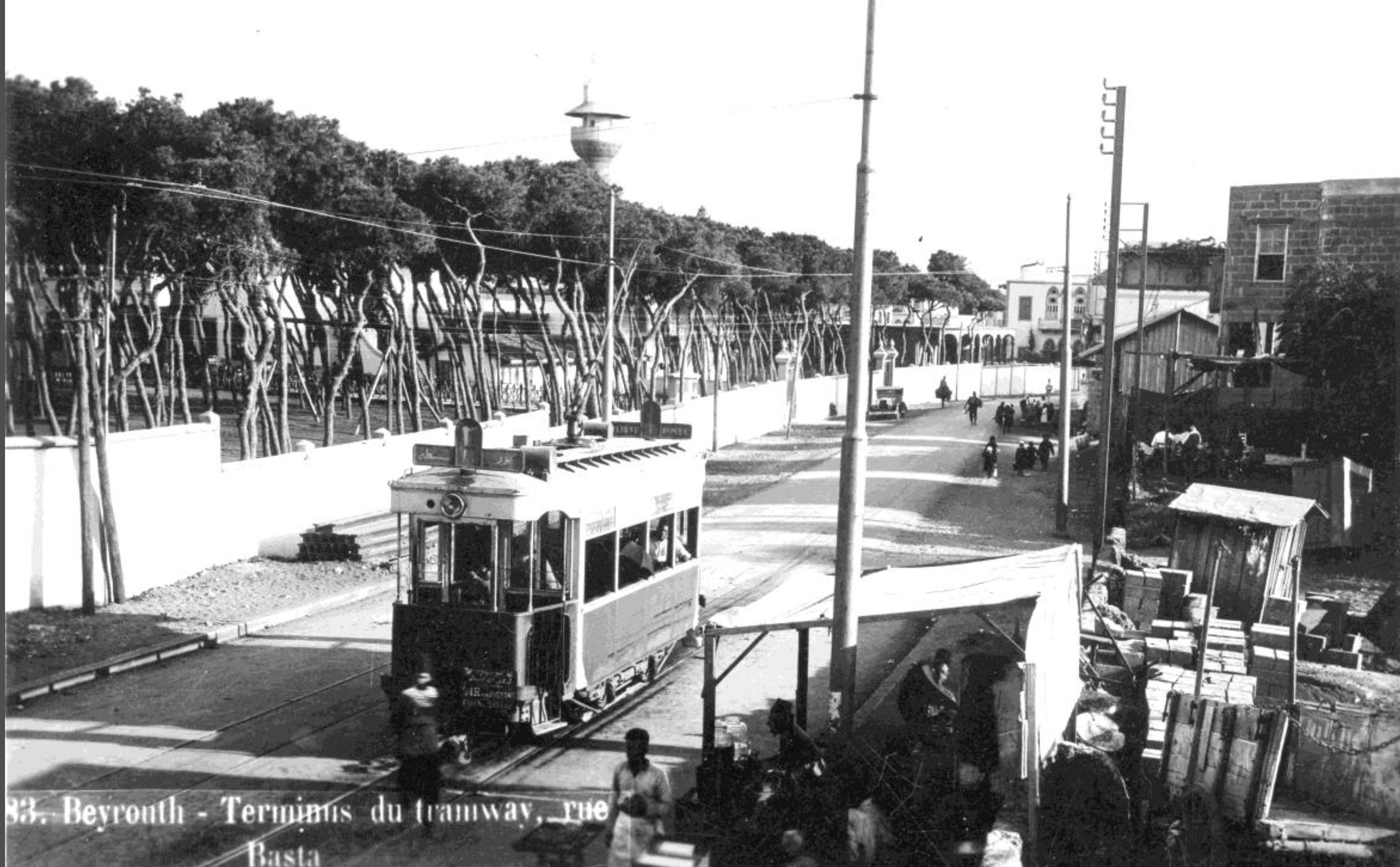
Terminus on Basta Street, 1925

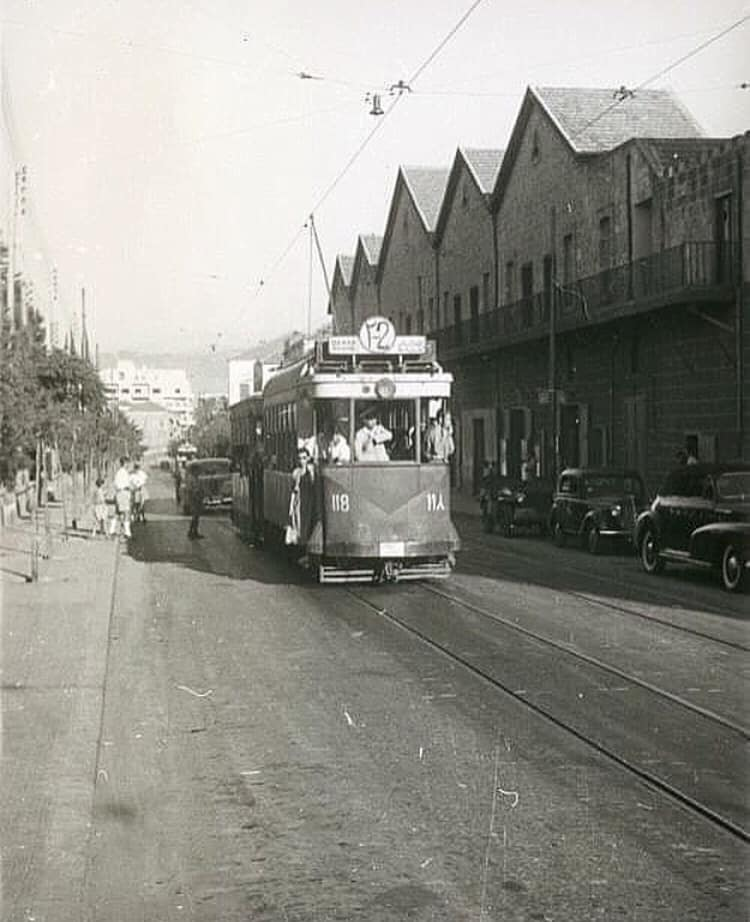
Line 2 tram in Bliss Street, 1940s

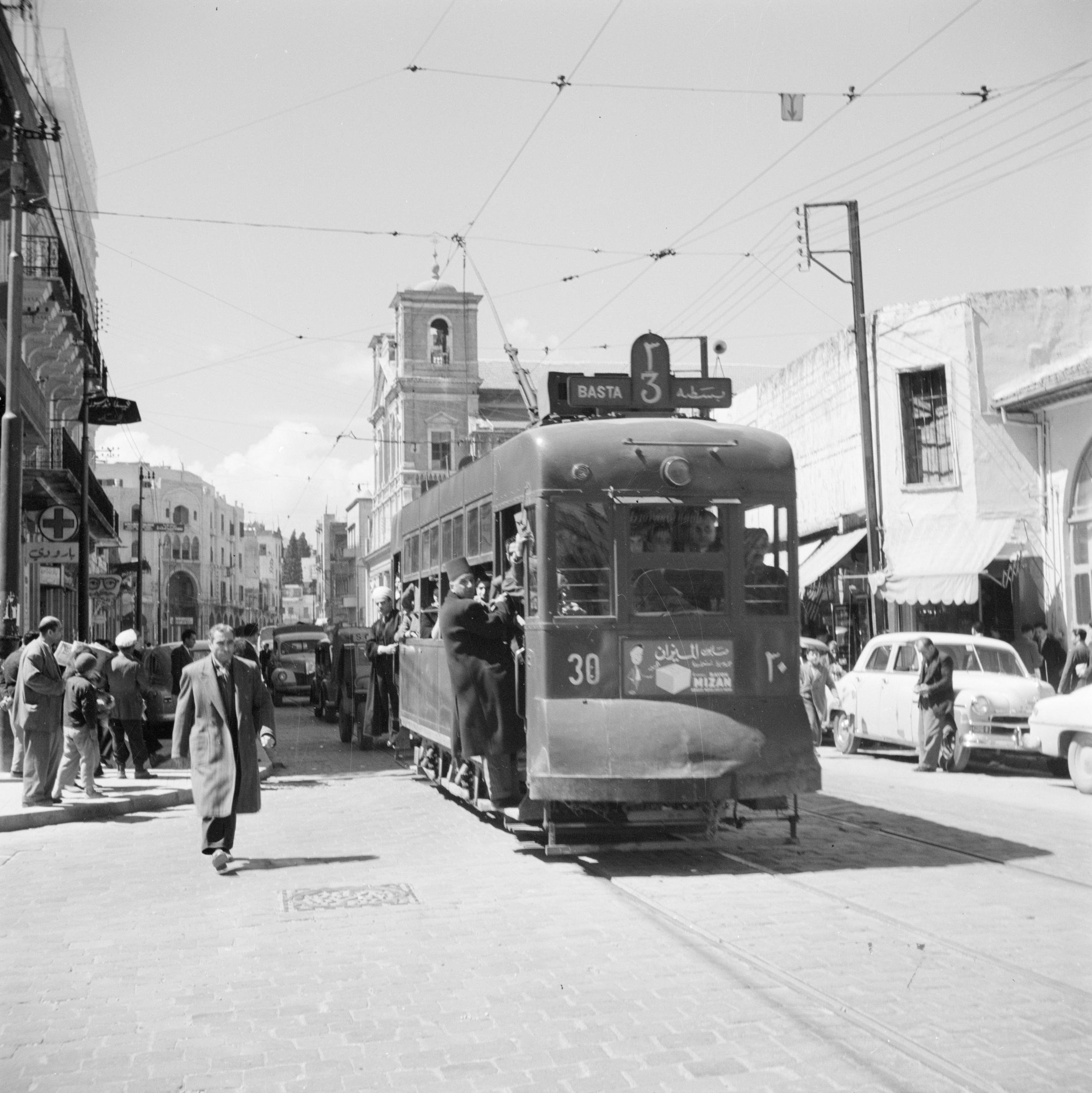
Line 3 tram, 1950s

Network plan, 1961

== See also ==
- Rail transport in Lebanon
