= Sawfar =

Sawfar صوفر Sawfar, Saoufar, Sofar
- Village
- Ru’ Aysat Sawfar
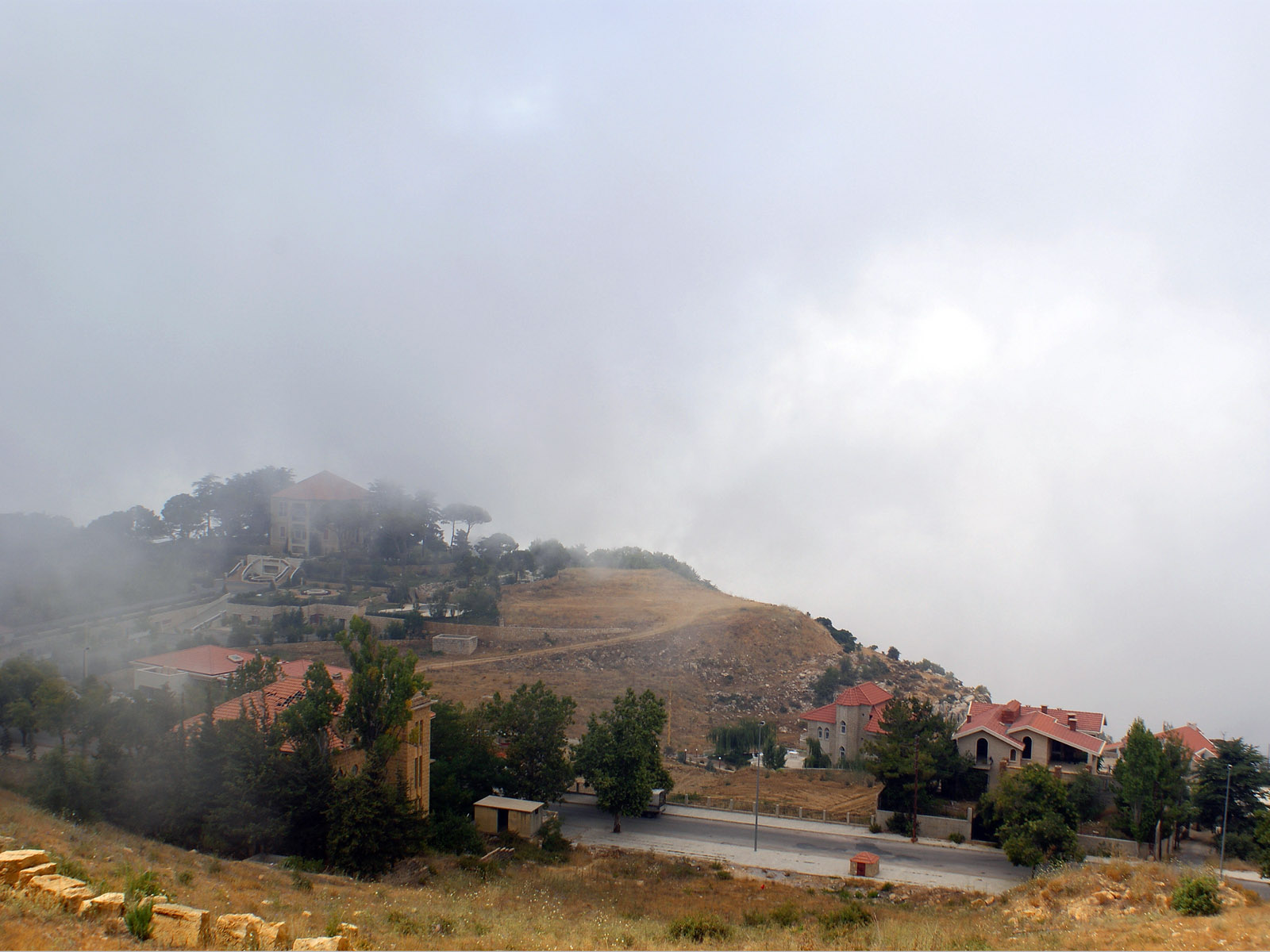
- Sawfar, afternoon mist

- Location in Lebanon
- Coordinates: 33°48′10″N 35°42′2″E
- Country: Lebanon
- Governorate: Mount Lebanon
- District: Aley

Population
  - Total: 3,500−4,000
- Time zone: UTC +2 (EST)
  - Summer (DST): UTC +3 (EEST)
- Website: https://www.cityofaley.com/villages/sofar/

Ru’ Aysat Sawfar or Sawfar (Arabic: رويسات صوفر or صوفر, French: Rue’ Aysat Sawfar), Sawfar, Saoufar or Sofar) is a village in the Aley District of the Mount Lebanon Governorate in Lebanon. Perched at an elevation of more than 1,433 metres (4,701 feet), Sawfar lies adjacent to the main road that connects Beirut to Damascus.

Situated near Mdayrej and the peak of Dahr el Baydar, a former ski centre, Sawfar is 27 km from Beirut in the district of Aley, with an average elevation of 1300 m above sea level. It overlooks the Lamartine Valley and adjacent gorges, including Hammana and Falougha.

There are between 3,300–4,000 people living in Sawfar, the most of them being Druze.

== Etymology ==
The name Sawfar can be interpreted in a variety of ways, all of which accurately characterise features of this charming community. For instance, the term "asfar" (or yellow) describes the hue of the rising sun as it crosses the mountains in the morning, while the autumn foliage's rainbow of hues heralds the arrival of new seasons. The bird's whistle is probably a metaphor for the sound of the winds, which Sofar cannot exist without. For whatever reason, Sofar is a community that is unlike any other, a village that seems to have been lost in time.

== History ==
Due to its water resources, Sawfar was formerly known as Ain Sawfar. Ain Ibrahim, Ain Sursock, Ain Beit Tabet, and Ain Saaf-Saafi are a few other "ains". In 1890, the Sawfar Municipality was founded, led by the well-known Beirutian families of Daouk, Beyham, Salam, Sabargh, Trad, Sursock, and Nakkache.

The French Embassy in Lebanon has its summer headquarters in this hamlet. The Chateau Bernina hotel is located innorthern Sawfar, with views of Kneise Mountain and the Lamartine Valley.

Distinguished by its elevated location atop the mountain and the surrounding valleys, Sawfar emerged as a preferred summer retreat for upper-class individuals. The railway that connected Beirut to the Bekaa Valley and Damascus during the 1880s is largely responsible for the village's notoriety. The Haute Bourgeoisie of Beirut were drawn to the area by its easy access and breathtaking landscape overlooking the Lamartine Valley, and they constructed opulent houses there. Sawfar served as a transit route and rest area for travellers travelling between Syria and Lebanon prior to 1950.

The Grand Sawfar Hotel hosted the first Arab League conference in Lebanon in the 1950s. In 1969, rare natural Lebanese amber was found in Sofar during excavations for the railway station.

The Grand Sawfar Hotel and the railway line were built in 1885, respectively, and these developments spurred business growth and made the town a well-liked vacation spot. and kept that standing until 1982. 2018 saw the Grand Sawfar Hotel reopen as a location for art exhibitions after serving as a preferred travel destination for royals and dignitaries from 1892 to 1975.

Sawfar is still regarded as beautiful because of its rich history, opulent houses, and architecture. The 5.5-kilometer longest bridge in Lebanon is located near Sawfar and has been there since 2001.

== Climate ==
The village experiences all four seasons, and attracts visitors all year round. Tourists visit during the warmer summer days as well as during the snowy winter season.

The summer months of Sawfar can reach up to temperatures of 20-30 °C (68-78 °F). In the winter, Sawfar receives significant snowfall, which can exceed one meter high after particularly heavy storms. Temperatures usually drop below zero during the months of December and January. The village experiences moderate and dry summers, making it a destination for tourists wishing to escape the extreme summer heat and humidity common to other areas in the region.

Sawfar receives heavy snow during the winter, often reaching over 1 meter. Temperatures usually drop to less than zero during the months of December and January. Nevertheless, it experiences moderate and dry summers, which is why it has long been considered a perfect destination for Beiruti residents escaping the humidity of the coastline during hot summers.

== Gallery ==
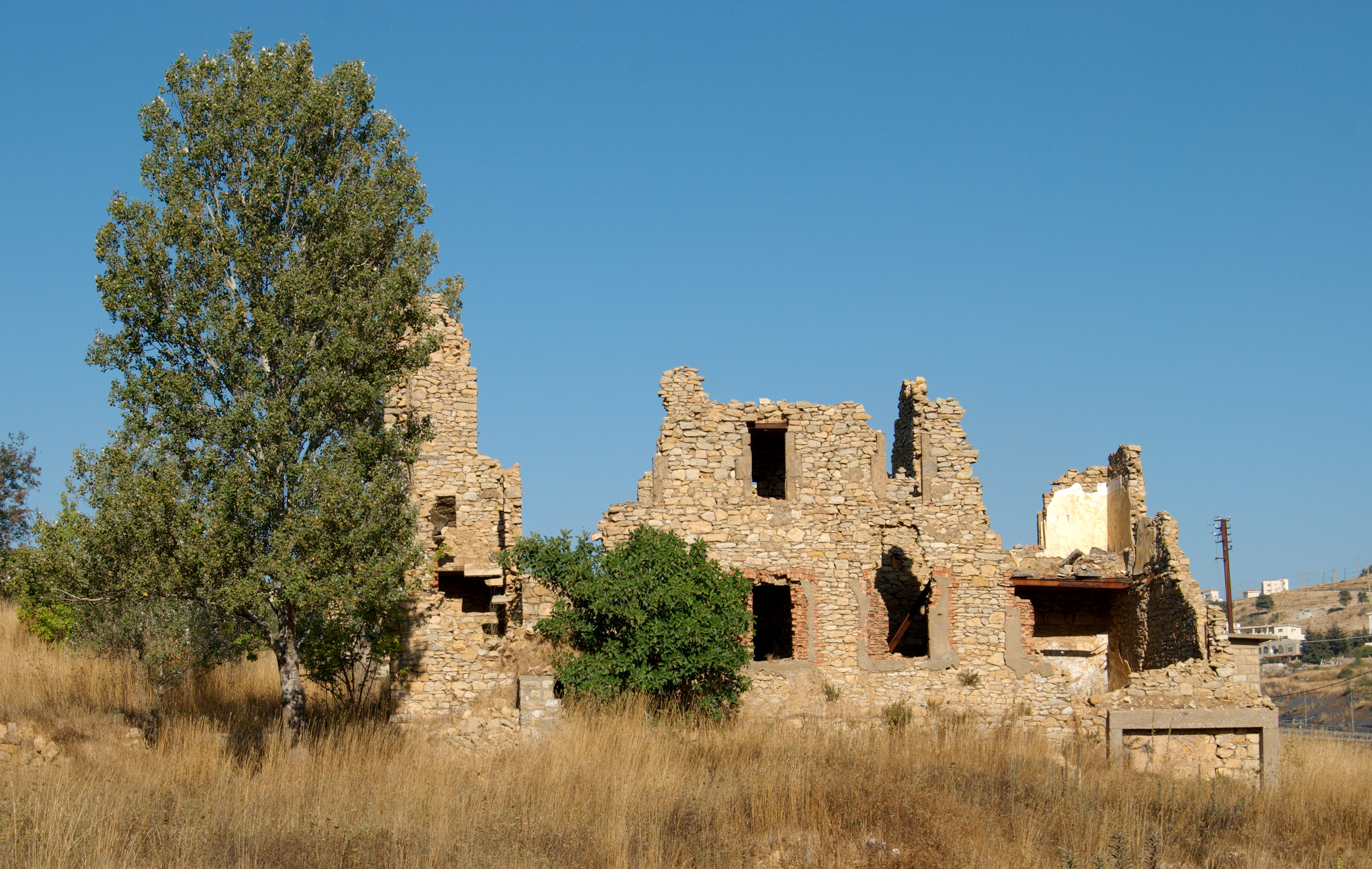
Ruined house in Sawfar

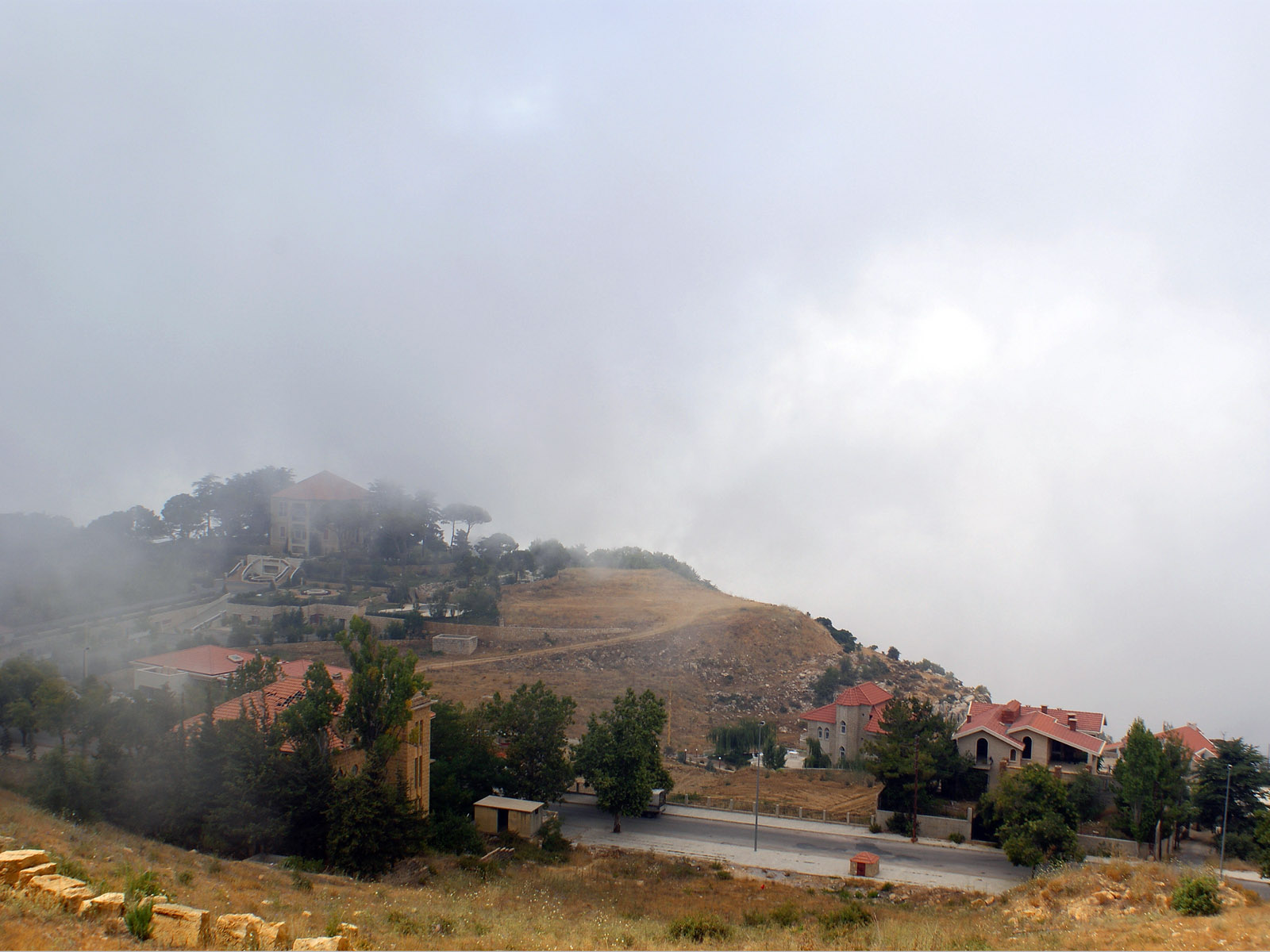
Sawfar's afternoon mist

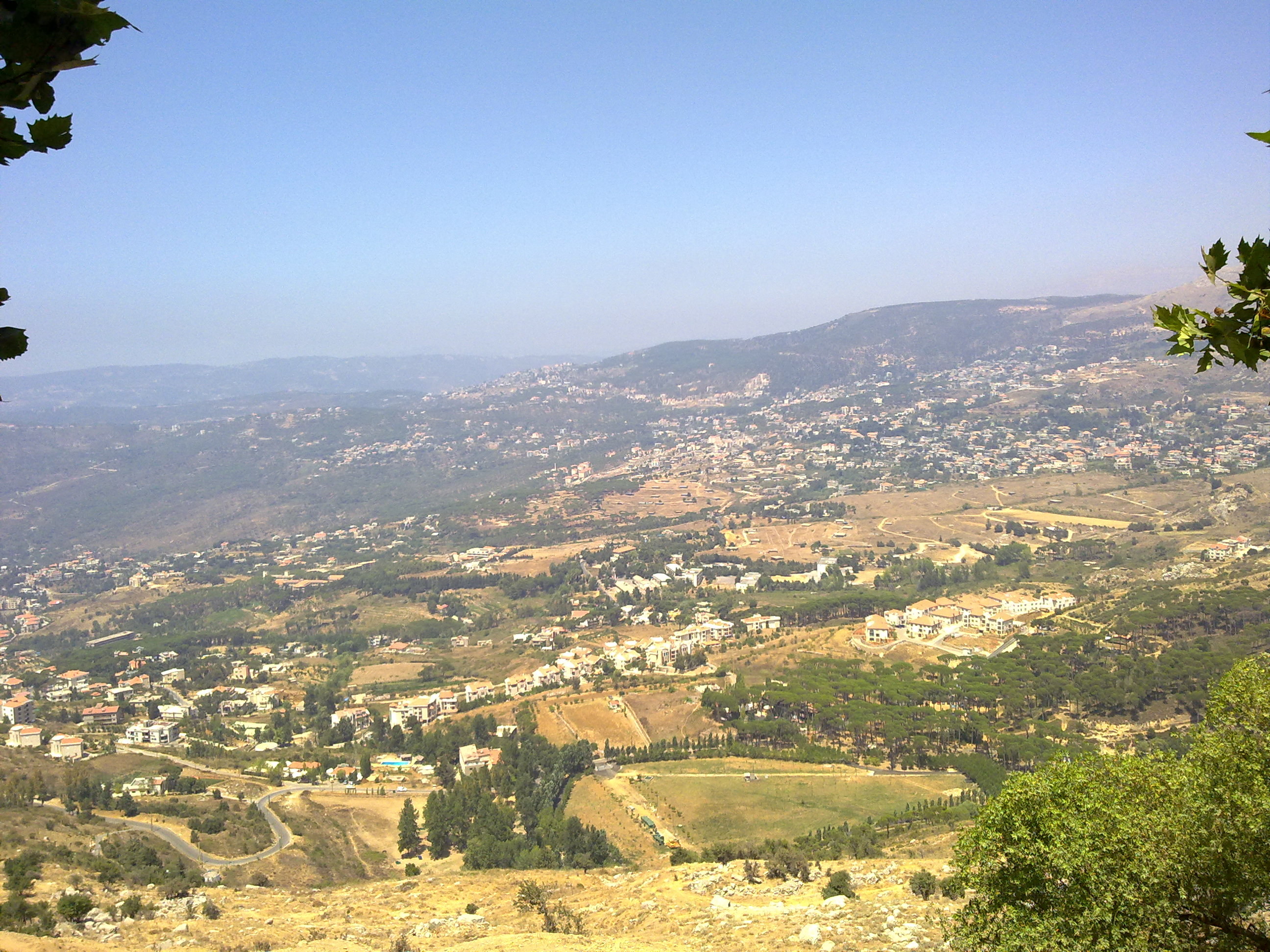
Panoramic view

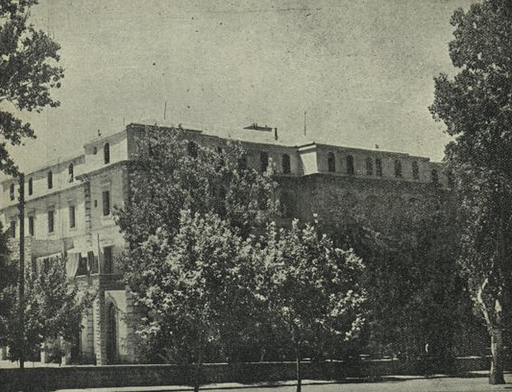
Grand Hotel of Sawfar

== See also ==
- Mudeirej Bridge
- Grand Sawfar Hotel
