= Litani River =

River in Lebanon

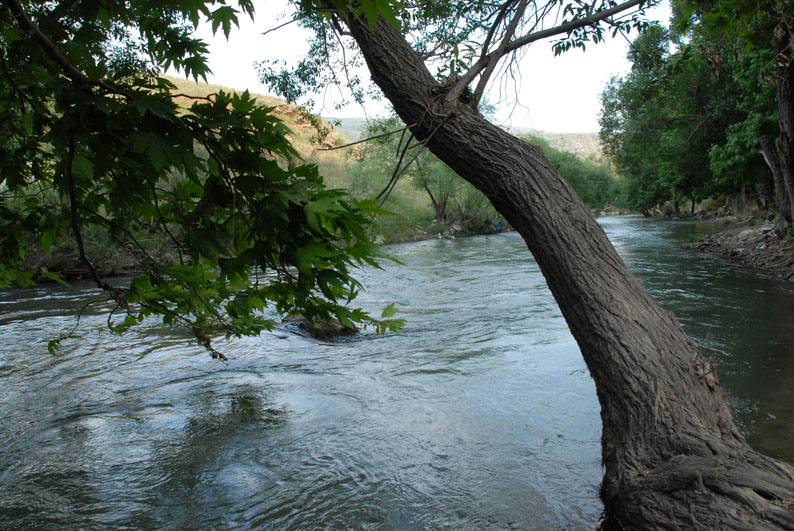

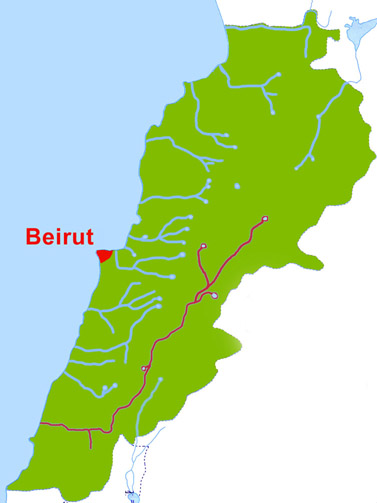
- The Litani River in dark red; Beirut in red

Location
- Country: Lebanon

Physical characteristics
- Source
  - location: Beqaa Valley (N-S section); N boundary of South Lebanon (E-W section)
  - coordinates: 34°00′53″N 36°05′56″E
- Mouth: Levantine Sea Mediterranean Sea
  - location: North of Tyre, South Governorate, Lebanon
  - coordinates: 33°20′23″N 35°14′39″E
- Length: 174 km (108 mi)
- Basin size: 2 110 km^{2}
- Discharge
  - average: 29.17 m^{3}/s

The Upper Litani Basin (ULB)

The Litani River (Arabic: نهر الليطاني, romanized: Nahr al-Līṭānī), the classical Leontes (Ancient Greek: Λεόντης, romanized: Leóntes, lit. 'lion river'), known in medieval times as Līṭa (Arabic: نهر ليطا, romanized: Nahr Līṭā), is an important water resource in southern Lebanon. The river rises in the fertile Beqaa Valley, west of Baalbek, and empties into the Mediterranean Sea north of Tyre. Exceeding 140 km (87 mi) in length, the Litani is the longest river that flows entirely in Lebanon and provides an average annual flow estimated at 0.92 km^{3}. The Litani provides a major source for water supply, irrigation, and hydroelectricity throughout the country.

== Etymology ==
The Litani was named for the Semitic sea-serpent Ltn (reconstructed pronunciation līyitānu), a seven-headed sea serpent and servant of the sea god Yam. Robert Rose argued that the deity is the personified river, which winds and coils itself like a serpent through the Beqaa Valley. The oldest reference to the Litani, and reference to its name, is found in Papyrus Anastasi I 21.1, where it is spelled Nṯn.

== History ==
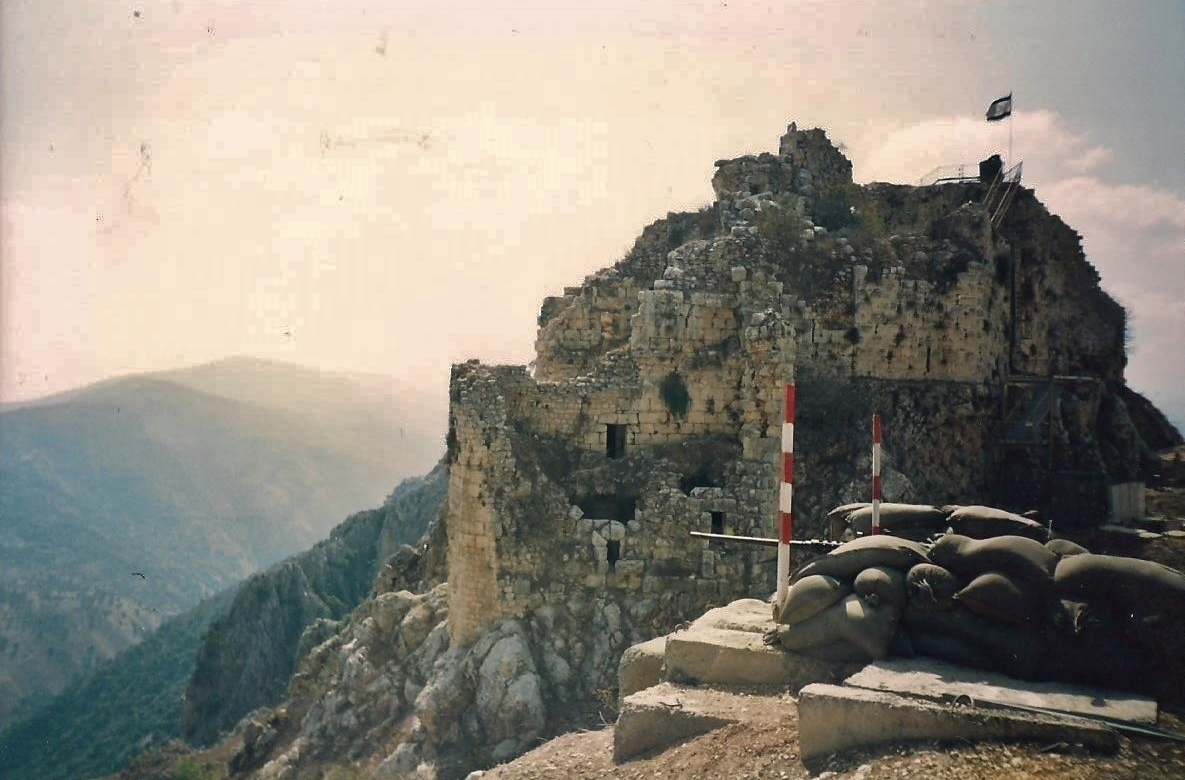
The medieval Crusader Beaufort Castle famously overlooks the Litani River.

=== Ancient and medieval periods ===
In antiquity, the river marked territorial boundaries between different civilizations, including Phoenicians and later Hellenistic and Roman authorities. It was known as the Leontes River in Greek and Latin sources. The region around the river was important for trade and agriculture, particularly in Roman times when irrigation systems were developed.

=== 1950s to 1960s ===
From the early 1950s on, the potential of the Litani was recognized as a fundamental part of the technological infrastructure of Lebanon. The Litani River Authority (LRA) was established in 1954 and Selim Lahoud was named its president. Funding for the project was mainly provided by the World Bank. The first attempt to build the dam was not successful because of technical issues. During Fouad Chehab’s presidency the top management of the LRA was changed. Henry Naccache was appointed its president in june 1960 and Salah Halwani its general director.

Under Naccache’s leadership, the LRA redressed the dam project and completed it in stages from 1962 through 1966. The dam was named the "Albert Naccache Dam" after Henry Naccache’s father and the lake was named Lake Qaraoun. The first attempt to drill the Awwali tunnel in 1958 having failed because of the extremely difficult soil composition, the LRA restarted and completed the work with the essential help of French experts. The tunnel is 16km long. During this period, the LRA also completed the Abd El Al and Arcache hydroelectric power plants. In early 1967, work started on the Joun plant.

Beset by all sorts of administrative and political hurdles and unable to overcome resistance against the vital irrigation projects, Naccache resigned from his position five times. Only the fifth was accepted in 1967.

=== 2020s ===
By 2022, the river had also become central in geopolitical discussions due to its proximity to Israel and its strategic significance in water politics.

In March 2026, during the Lebanon war, Israeli Finance Minister Bezalel Smotrich called for Israel to annex Lebanese territory up to the Litani River after the war. Defense Minister Israel Katz said that the military would establish a buffer zone extending to the river until the threat posed by Hezbollah was eliminated and that all homes in Lebanese border villages would be destroyed.

== Geography ==
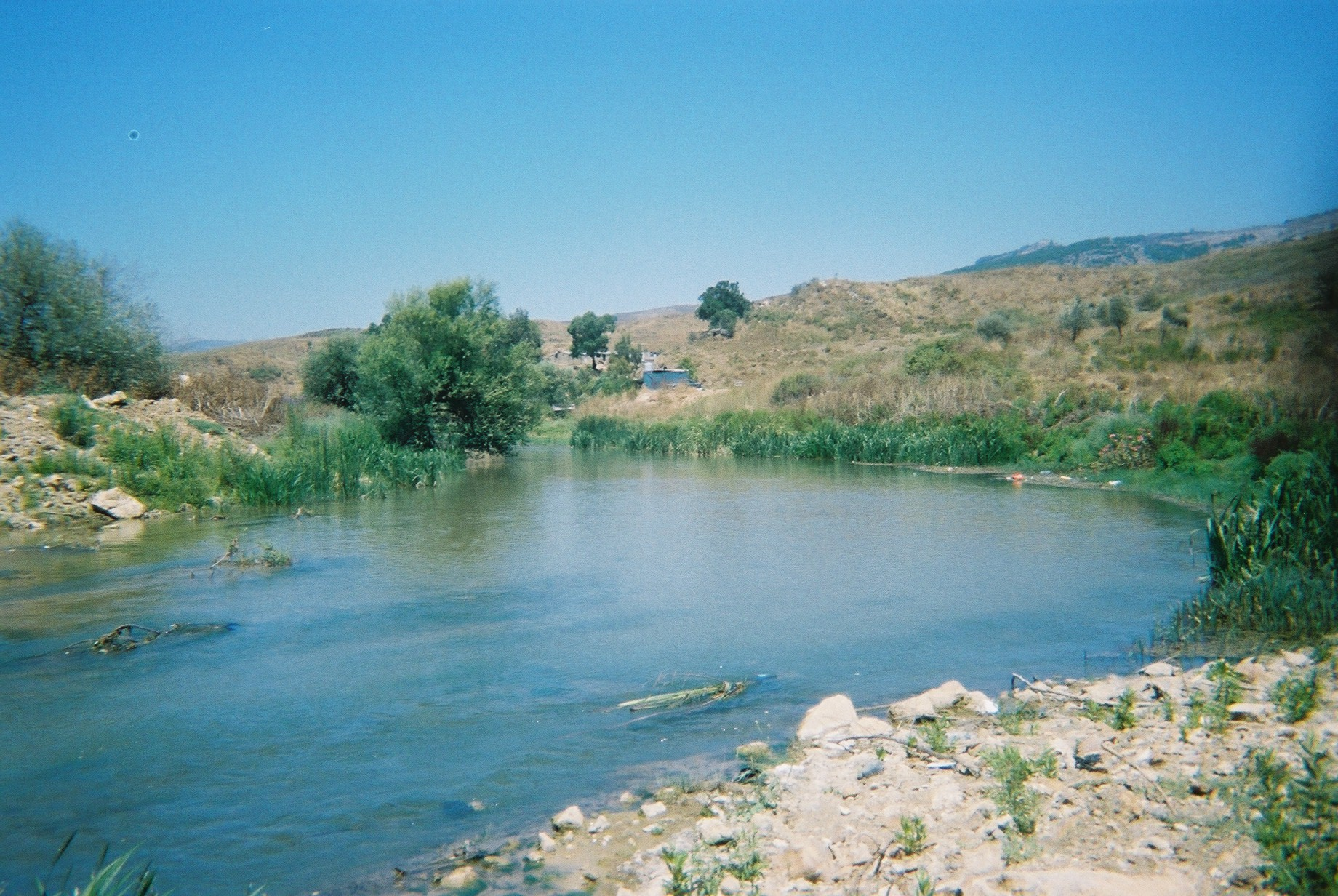
The southern part of the Litani River

The Litani River, stretching 174 km with 60 km of tributaries, traverses diverse climates from coastal subtropical to dry continental. Its basin encompasses 2110 km2, making it the largest watershed in Lebanon and covering about 20% of the country's total area. The basin spans 263 villages in 12 districts and 4 governorates, covering a significant portion of Lebanon's ecological landscape and contributing around 30% of the total water flow in the country.

Within the basin of the Litani River, there are notable natural features, including Kafr Zabad (60 ha), characterized by marshland, constant springs, riparian woodland, and pine woodlands. The Aammiq wetlands (280 ha), designated a World Nature Reserve, serves as an important point in global bird migration routes, hosting nearly 250 bird species.

After heading south parallel to the Syrian border, the course of the river bends westward. Near this bend, the Litani comes within five km of the Hasbani River.

=== Qasimiyeh (E-W section) ===
As of 2004, the portion of the river flowing west is called the Qasimiyeh (variously transliterated as Qasmiyeh, Qasmiya, Qasimia). The Qasmieh - Ras-el-Aïn region, irrigated from the river's lower reaches from main irrigation canals, to south and north, is one of the largest irrigated areas in the nation, consisting of 32.64 km², shared among 1257 irrigating farmers, who concentrate on citrus crops and bananas.

For the entire stretch of the Qasimiyeh as it flows into the Mediterranean Sea, the Litani River remains nearly parallel to, and about 29 km (18 mi) north of, the Israeli-Lebanese border. 10 km north of Tyre, the river is crossed by the ancient Leontes Bridge. In June 1941, the mouth of the river was the site of an attack by British commandos and Australian troops on Vichy French forces that became known as the Battle of the Litani River.

=== Bridges ===
Jisr is the Arabic word for 'bridge'.

- Jisr el-Kasmieh/Qasimiyeh (Roman Leontes Bridge); in ruins
- Jisr el-Akai
- Jisr el-Khardali
- Jisr el-Khatueh (Kakhieh)
- Jisr el-Burghuz
- Jisr el-Meshghara
- Jisr el-Karaoum

== Albert Naccache Dam ==
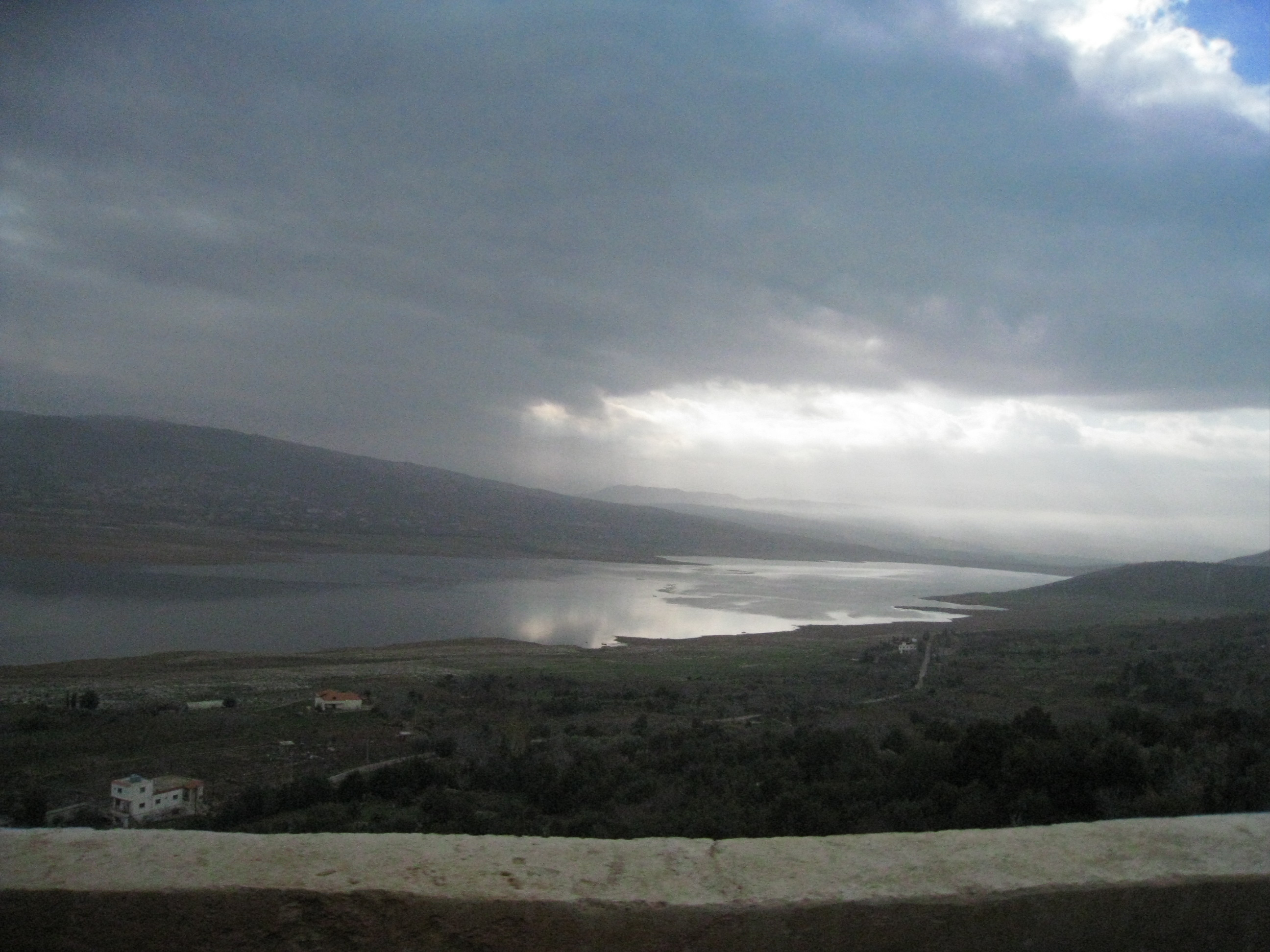
The Albert Naccache Dam, as seen from the highway to the west.

Lake Qaraoun, an artificial lake of 12 square km, was created by the Albert Naccache Dam, 60 meters high and 1,350 meters in length, which was completed in 1966. A spillway of 6503 meters carries the water to the underground station where generators produce a maximum of 185 megawatts of electricity, the largest hydroelectric project in Lebanon. The dam was intended eventually to provide irrigation for 310 km² of farmland in South Lebanon and 80 km² in the Beqaa Valley. The office is at the southern (dam) end of the lake on the left side.

== Litani River Authority ==
The Litani River Authority was formed in 1954 to facilitate the integrated development of the Litani River Basin. Shortly after its formation, the authority engaged in a massive hydroelectric development project that tapped the 850 meter head potential between Lake Qaraoun and the Mediterranean.

This development has brought about major hydrological changes to the Litani River Basin, where the flows from its upper reaches above Lake Qaraoun, referred to as the Upper Litani Basin, are diverted through a system of tunnels, ponds and plants, to meet the Mediterranean several kilometers north of its original natural tailwater. These changes resulted in the effective hydrological separation between the Upper Litani Basin and the lower reaches.

The advent of a protracted civil strife in the 1970s followed by a prolonged occupation in the 1980s that lasted into the 1990s, plunged Lebanon into disarray, freezing development and investment in infrastructure. The return to normal conditions has encouraged the river authority to initiate several major water diversion projects from the Upper Litani Basin worth hundreds of millions of US dollars.

== Agriculture ==
A crucial aspect of the Litani River's importance lies in its role as an agricultural lifeline. It irrigates thousands of hectares of farmland, contributing significantly to Lebanon's food security. Approximately 31% of the income within the basin stems from agriculture, sustaining a considerable portion of the population.

== Pollution ==
The Litani River contends with pollution concerns, impacting both the river itself and the Qaraaoun Reservoir. Numerous studies, including microbiological and chemical analyses, revealed contamination exceeding standard levels. The root causes include uncontrolled sewage disposal and the indiscriminate use of fertilizers in agriculture, threatening both water quality and the health of the river.

== See also ==
- Battle of the Litani River (1941), during the Second World War, between Allied forces and Vichy French troops
- Operation Litani, 1978 Israeli invasion of Southern Lebanon
- United Nations Interim Force in Lebanon, the international community peacekeeping effort created after the 1978 Operation Litani
