= Leontes Bridge =

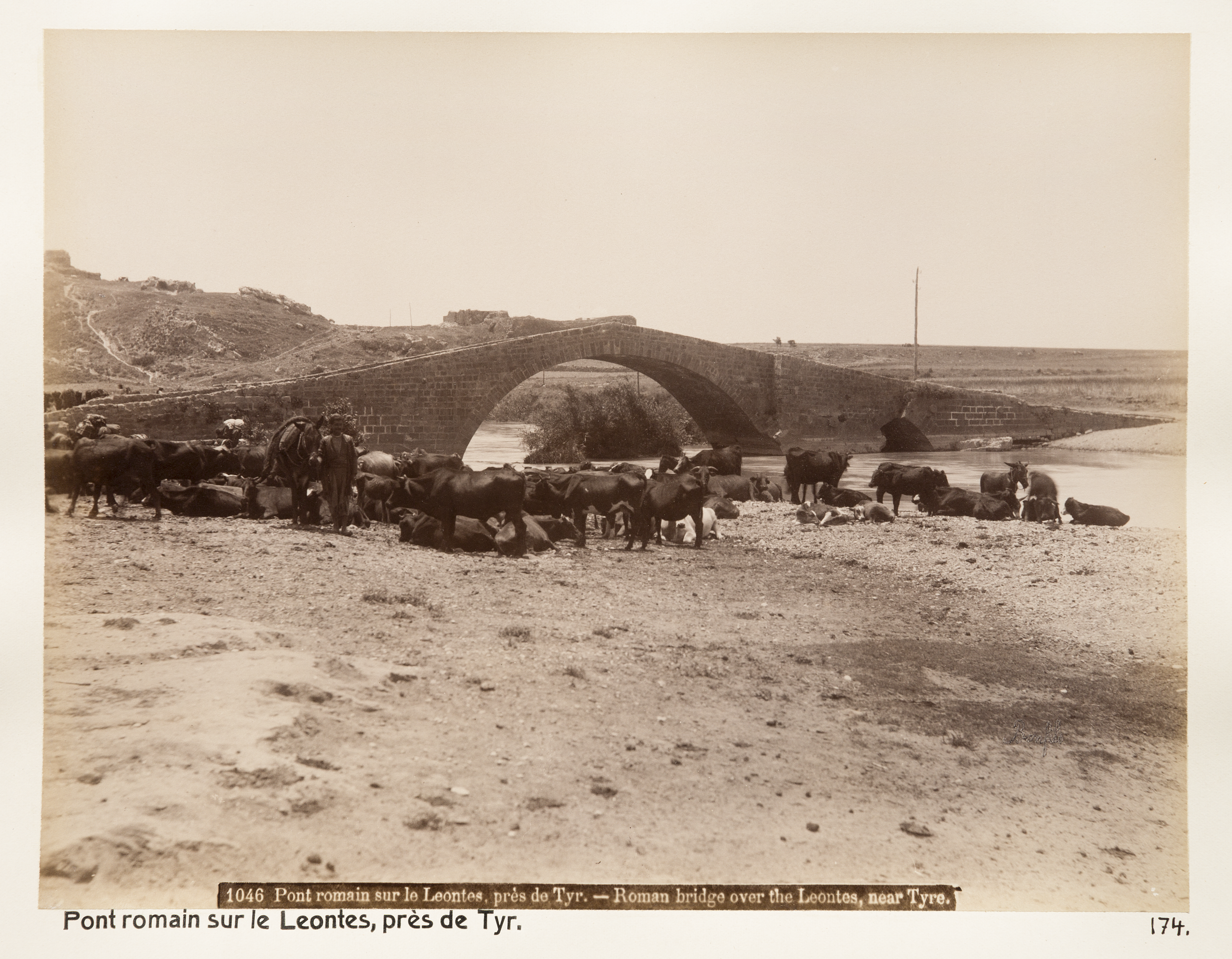
- Leontes Bridge, by Félix Bonfils
- Coordinates: 33°20′22″N 35°15′03″E
- Crosses: Litani (Leontes)
- Locale: Close to Tyre, Lebanon

Characteristics
- Design: Segmental arch bridge
- No. of spans: 1

History
- Construction end: 3rd or 4th century AD

Location
- Interactive map of Leontes Bridge

The Leontes Bridge is a ruined Roman bridge in Lebanon; it crossed the Litani River (the ancient Leontes) in the vicinity of Nahr Abou Assouad, 10 km north of Tyre. The bridge, which is dated to the 3rd or 4th century AD, featured a comparatively flat arch with a span-to-rise ratio of 3.1 to 1.

According to examination of modern satellite data (Google Earth), it appears that the Roman bridge is in fact destroyed. One can see the approach masonry from the north and south, in addition to the center support ruins still visible in the river.

The bridge was destroyed during the Battle of the Litani River (9 June 1941) during WWII:

The 21st Australian Brigade advanced along the coast road heading for Beirut and attempted to cross the Litani River. A surprise night time landing by the British No. 11 (Scottish) Commando, under the command of Lieutenant Colonel R.L. Pedder (Highland Light Infantry), was attempted in order to seize the bridge near the mouth of the river, but was delayed by rough seas on the proposed landing beach. This gave the Vichy French defenders enough time to destroy the bridge. When the commandos eventually landed in daylight, in three separate places, the initial landing was almost unopposed due to the defenders being in combat against the Australian troops, subsequently in the fighting they took heavy casualties, among them Pedder, who was killed in an assault on the French barracks. He was succeeded in command by Geoffrey Keyes, whose party was ultimately able to secure the crossing by getting over the river in canvas boats with the help of some of the Australian troops.

== See also ==
- List of Roman bridges
- Roman architecture
- Roman engineering
