= Jean-Paul Garnier =

French watchmaker (died 1869)

- Died: 1869
- Occupation: Watchmaker

Jean-Paul Garnier (died 14 February 1869, Paris), usually known as Paul Garnier, was a 19th-century French watchmaker and mechanic. He is best known for providing railway stations in France, Argentina, Almeria and built the clock placed in the tower made by Alexandre Gustave Eiffel, located in the park of Montecristi Dominican Republic and Romania with station clocks.
