= Mudeirej Bridge =

Coordinates: 33°48′3.0″N 35°43′37.5″E

Jisr el Mdeirej
- جسر المديرج
- Interactive map of the Jisr el Mdeirej area

General information
- Status: Completed
- Type: Bridge
- Location: Sawfar, Mount Lebanon,, Mdeirej, Lebanon
- Elevation: 1320 meters (4331 feet)
- Completed: 1998
- Renovated: August 2008
- Destroyed: 12 July 2006
- Cost: 44 million USD

Height
- Height: 70 meters (230 feet)

Technical details
- Structural system: Triple T-section girder bridge

Design and construction
- Structural engineer: Khatib & Alami
- Main contractor: TOTO Costruzion
- Designations: Connects the Beirut-Damascus Highway

The Mudeirej Bridge or Mdairej Bridge is a bridge in Lebanon. It was completed in 1998 as the tallest and highest bridge in Lebanon and the Middle East but this has since been surpassed. The bridge was built as part of Rafik Hariri's vision of rebuilding and developing Lebanon and its infrastructure. The bridge served as a connecting route for the Beirut-Damascus Highway aiming to improve the main road that links Syria's capital city Damascus, to Lebanon and its capital city Beirut.

== Destruction ==
On the 12th of July during the 2006 Lebanon-Israel conflict the Israeli Air force bombed the Mudeirej Bridge causing partial damage to its base and pillars, and critical damage to the road it uplifted. The destruction of the bridge was considered by some in Lebanon to be unjustified because of the perceived low strategic value to the bridge in Israeli's conflict with Hezbollah.

In 2007, USAID announced that it would be involved in an extensive reconstruction of the bridge, due to Lebanon's political victory which put Israel and the United States in an awkward position in regards to the destruction and reconstruction of the bridge. USAID put forward US$30 million for the project.

== Reconstruction work ==
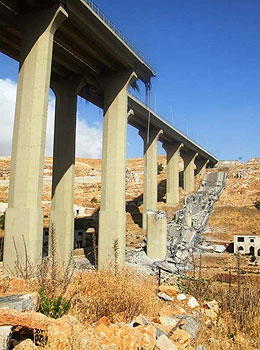
damaged span of the bridge after partial implosion

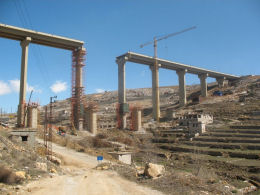

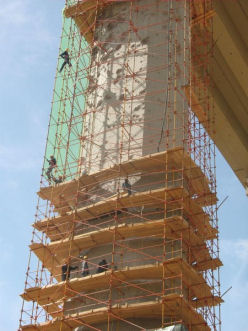
