= Arab Mashreq International Railway =

The Arab Mashreq International Railway is a proposed railway network in the Mashriq, which is located in Western Asia and eastern North Africa in the eastern part of the Arab world. The planned network has north–south and east–west axes, and 16 different routes covering 19,500 km. The plan would require significant investment, as sixty percent of the routes have not yet been built, and parts of the existing railway infrastructure are weak or have gauge differences; some states may be unable to make large investments in infrastructure. Like the European Trans-European Transport Network, the Agreement specifies a family of high-priority international routes, rather than setting service details or awarding contracts to operators.

== International agreement ==
The Agreement on International Railways in the Arab Mashreq was adopted on 17 April 2003. It entered into force on 23 May 2005 after it had been ratified by Egypt, Jordan, Lebanon and Syria. As of July 2016, it has been ratified by 12 states: Bahrain, Egypt, Iraq, Jordan, Kuwait, Lebanon, Saudi Arabia, the State of Palestine, Sudan, Syria, United Arab Emirates, and Yemen.

== Routes ==
- R05: Iraq - Kuwait - Saudi Arabia
- R15: Jordan - Saudi Arabia
- R25: Syria - Jordan - Saudi Arabia - Yemen
- R27: Syria
- R35: Syria - Lebanon
- R45: Egypt
- R10: Iraq - Syria
- R20: Syria
- R30: Syria - Lebanon
- R40: Iraq - Jordan
- R50: Gaza - Egypt
- R60: Egypt
- R70: Egypt
- R80: Saudi Arabia
- R82: Qatar
- R90: Oman - Yemen

== Jordan ==
Jordan joined OTIF in August 2010, and plans to become a hub for international rail transport. In 2011–2014, Jordan's Ministry of Transport plans to invest €2.6bn in rail infrastructure connected to the Arab Mashreq International Railway Network.

== Technical standards ==
The railway network will be built to 1,435 mm (4 ft 8 1/2 in) standard gauge, and UIC/B loading gauge.

== See also ==
- Gulf Railway
