= Citadel of Tartus =

Historic building in Tartus, Syria

- قلعة طرطوس
- Tartus, Syria
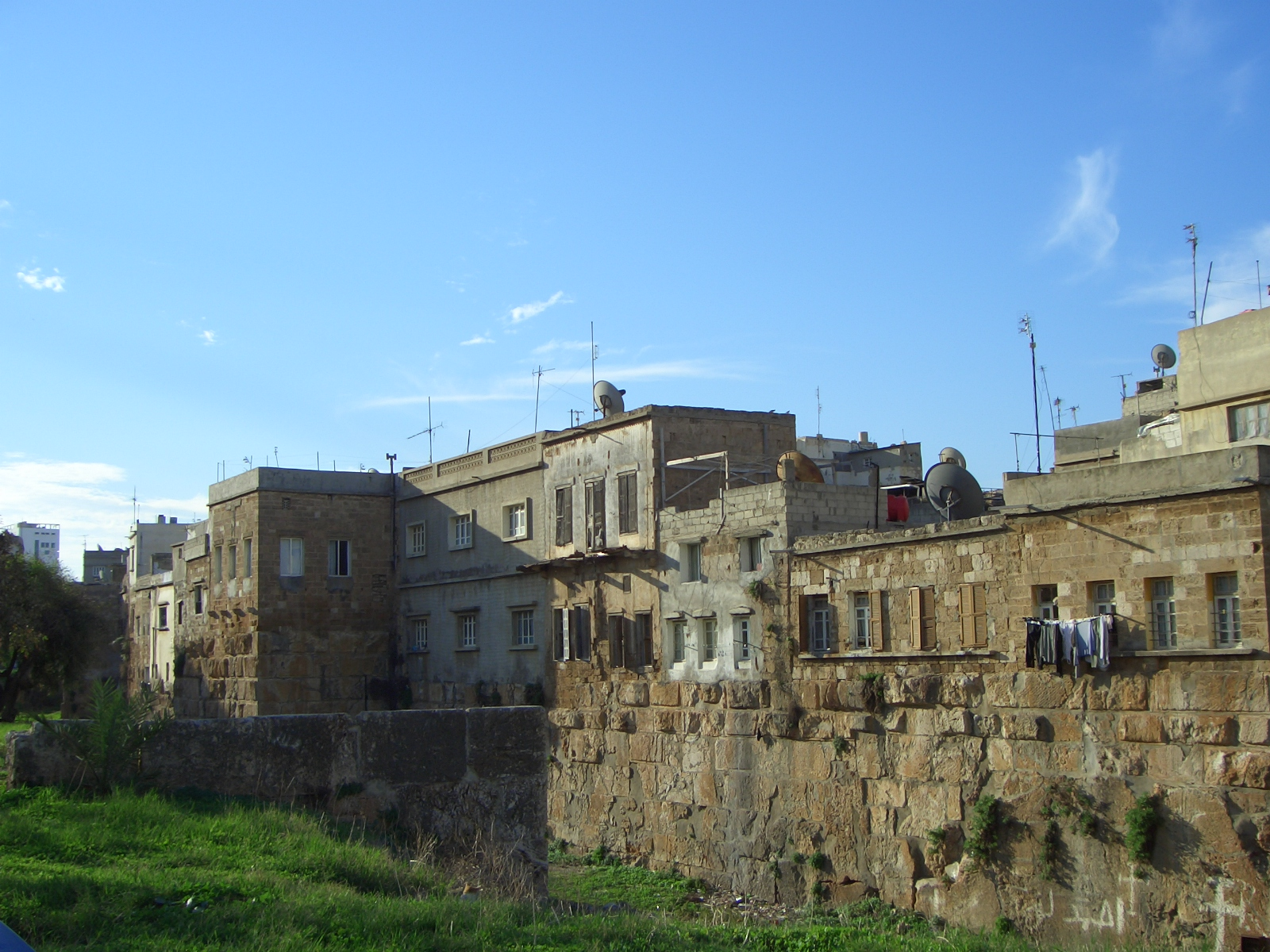
- Fortification wall and moat of the Citadel of Tartus

Site information
- Type: Castle
- Condition: Residential area

Location
- Coordinates: 34°53′37″N 35°52′36″E

The Citadel of Tartus (Arabic: قلعة طرطوس) is a historic building now mostly a residential area by the Mediterranean Sea in Tartus, Syria. It was one of the most important fortresses in the county of Tripoli.

== History ==
During the First Crusade, the crusaders besieged Tartus in 1099, which they won in a short time. However, as the Crusaders marched towards Jerusalem, they did not leave enough protection and the castle was recaptured by Banu Ammar. It was Raymond IV, Count of Toulouse, who reconquered the city and the castle in February 1102 after a two-week siege.

The castle was given to the custody of the Knights Templar around 1165, in addition to part of the city following a raid by Nur ad-Din as early as 1152, and the master of the order, Everard des Barres, undertook the rebuild of the castle with a chapel. The fortress was part of the County of Tripoli, and was besieged several times including one in June 1180 by sea, but without effect due to resistance. From 3 to 11 July 1188, Saladin also besieged the castle and devastated the lower town, which had previously been emptied of all its inhabitants, but could not gain access to the keep, defended by several brother-knights and the Master of the Order himself. Sultan Baibars tried in vain to capture the city twice in 1267 and 1271. Eventually, the castle was abandoned on August 3, 1291, by the Templars after the Siege of Acre on 28 May of the same year.

== Templar Commanders ==
- Alain: June 1183
- Roncelin de Fos: 1241/1242
- Pierre Lallemand: 1271
- Aymar de Peyrusse: 1278–1285
- Pierre de Severy: 1286
- Matthew Goulart: 1288

== Features ==
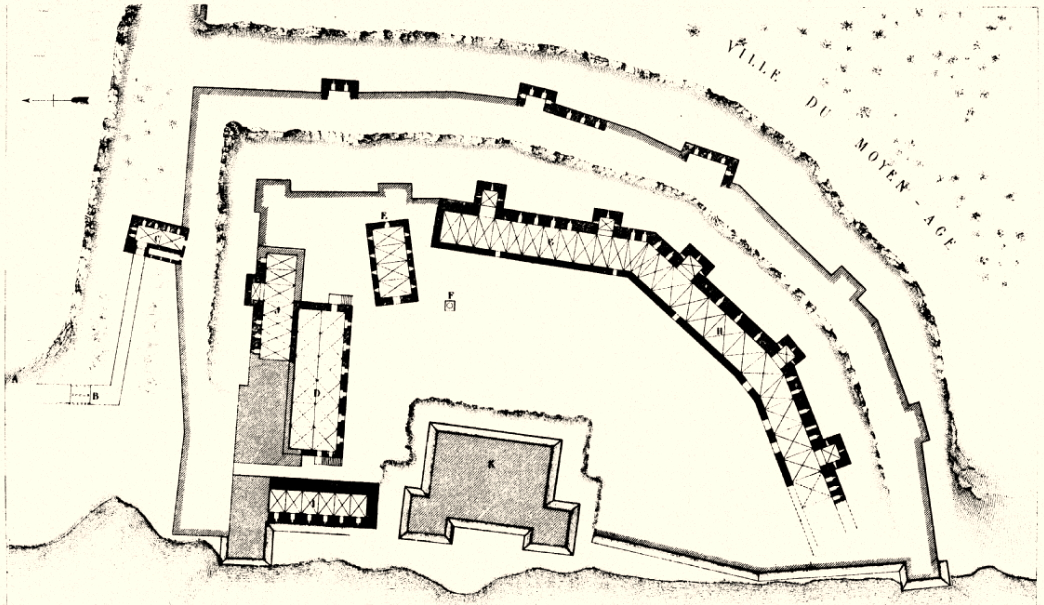
Citadel of Tartus layout as of 1871.

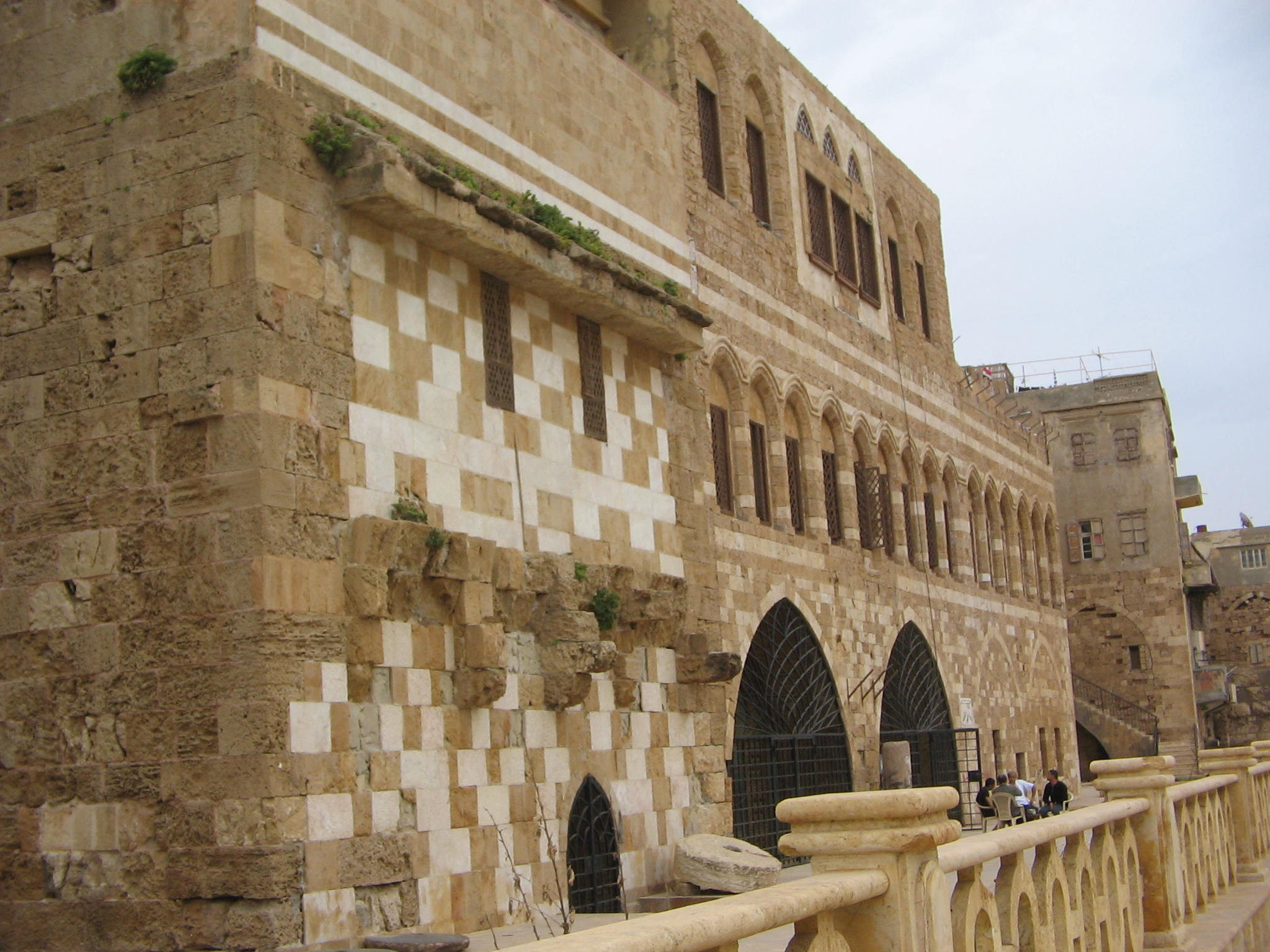
Facade overlooking the sea.

The castle consisted of two very thick semi-circular enclosure walls separated by a ditch, the outer wall was separated from the sea by a ditch, as described by Wilbrand of Oldenburg in 1211. Access to the castle was through a single gate served by a path exposed to blows from the defenders. The keep had a long shape and measured about thirty-five meters on its longest side and had two square towers on its western side, out of total eleven towers. The dungeon was separated from the rest of the castle by a large ditch. It had a postern which went out directly on the sea which allowed boats to be able to supply food and weapons during a siege. The central courtyard of the castle was bordered by a gallery with six large windows and columns.

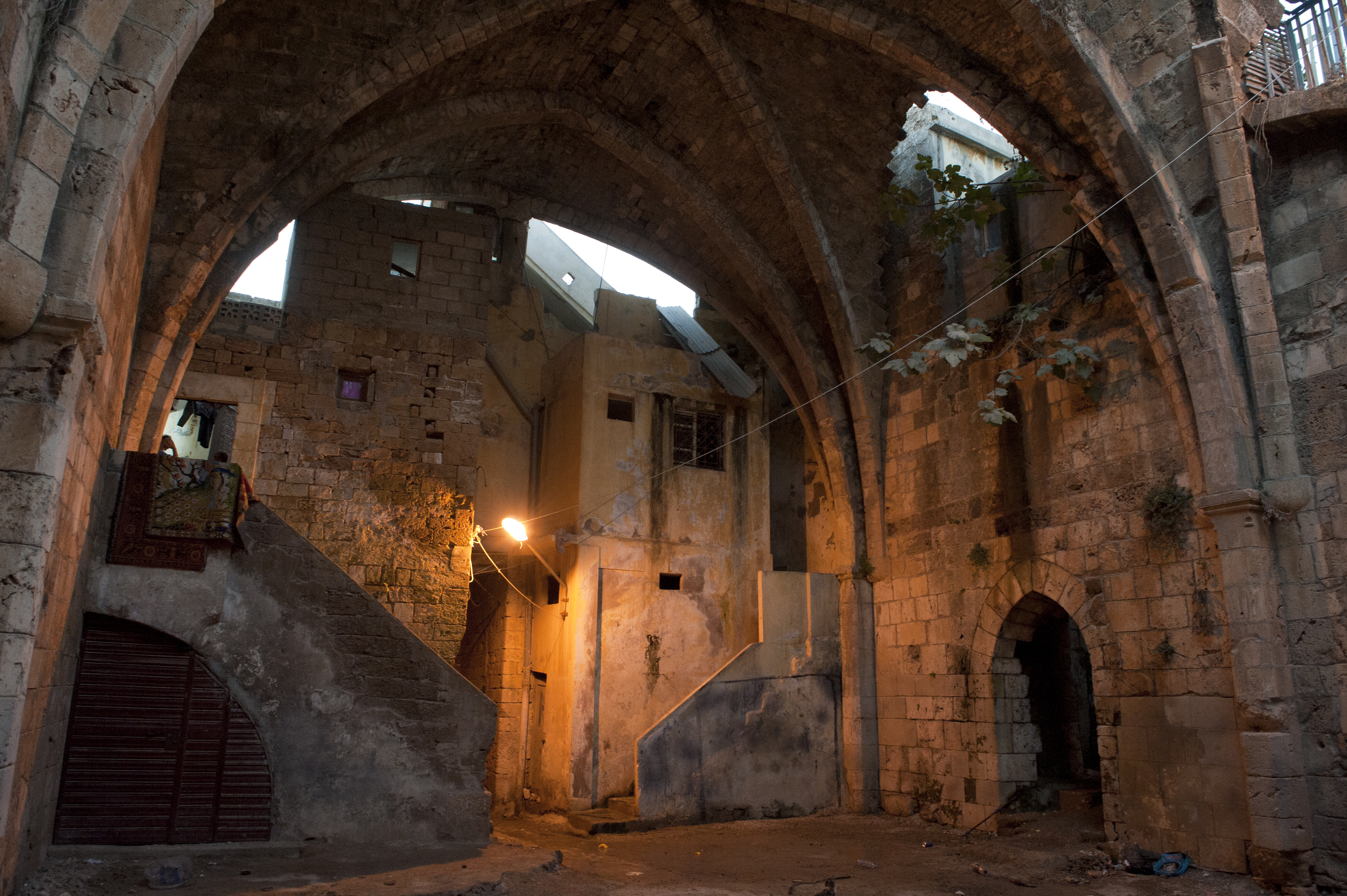
Citadel's chapel

The Templar chapel was not round like several other Western Templar monuments but entirely square and without an apse. It was lit by lancet windows.

Nowadays, there are hardly any remains. The ditches have been filled in, and there are only a few masonry foundations of the keep.

== See also ==
- List of castles in Syria

== Bibliography ==
- Claverie, Pierre-Vincent (2005). L'ordre du Temple en Terre Sainte et à Chypre au xiiie siècle (in French). Nicosia: Centre de Recherche Scientifique. ISBN 978-9-9630-8094-6.
- Melville, Marion (1974). La vie des templiers (in French). Gallimard. ISBN 978-2-0702-4377-8.
- Piana, Mathias; Carlsson, Christer (2016). Archaeology and Architecture of the Military Orders. Taylor & Francis. ISBN 9781317179856.
- Guillaume-Rey, Emmanuel (1888). L'Ordre du Temple en Syrie et à Chypre : les Templiers en Terre sainte (in French). Vol. 24. Revue de Champagne et de Brie.

== Sources ==
- Demurger, Alain (2008). Les Templiers, une chevalerie chrétienne au Moyen Âge (in French). Paris: Seuil. ISBN 978-2-7578-1122-1.
