= Cathedral of Our Lady of Tortosa =

Former Catholic cathedral in Tartus, Syria

Cathedral of Our Lady of Tortosa كاتدرائية طرطوس
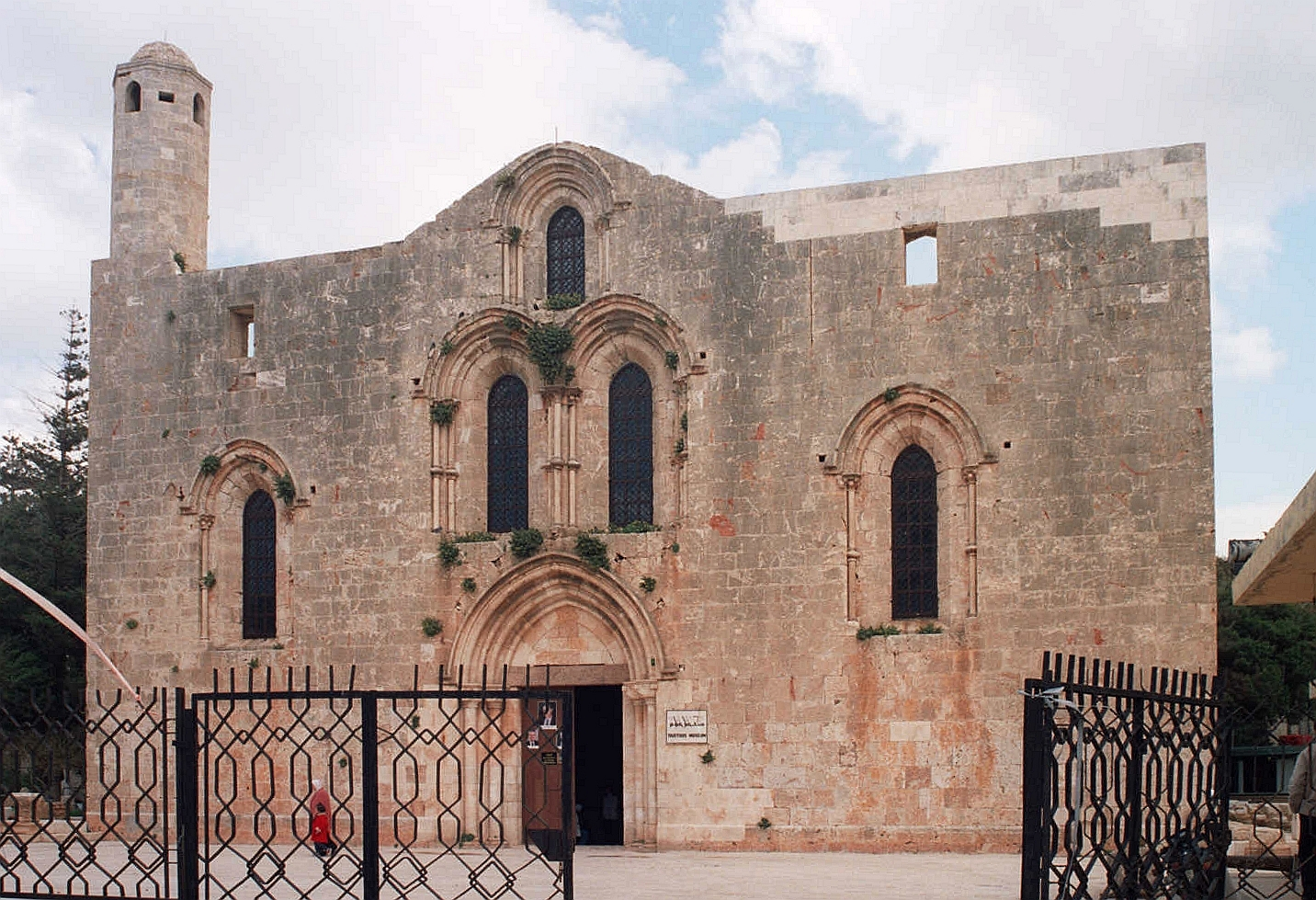

Religion
- Affiliation: Catholic Church
- Year consecrated: mid-12th century
- Status: Museum

Location
- Location: Tartus, Syria
- Interactive map of Cathedral of Our Lady of Tortosa كاتدرائية طرطوس
- Coordinates: 34°53′30″N 35°52′40″E

Architecture
- Style: Early Gothic, Romanesque

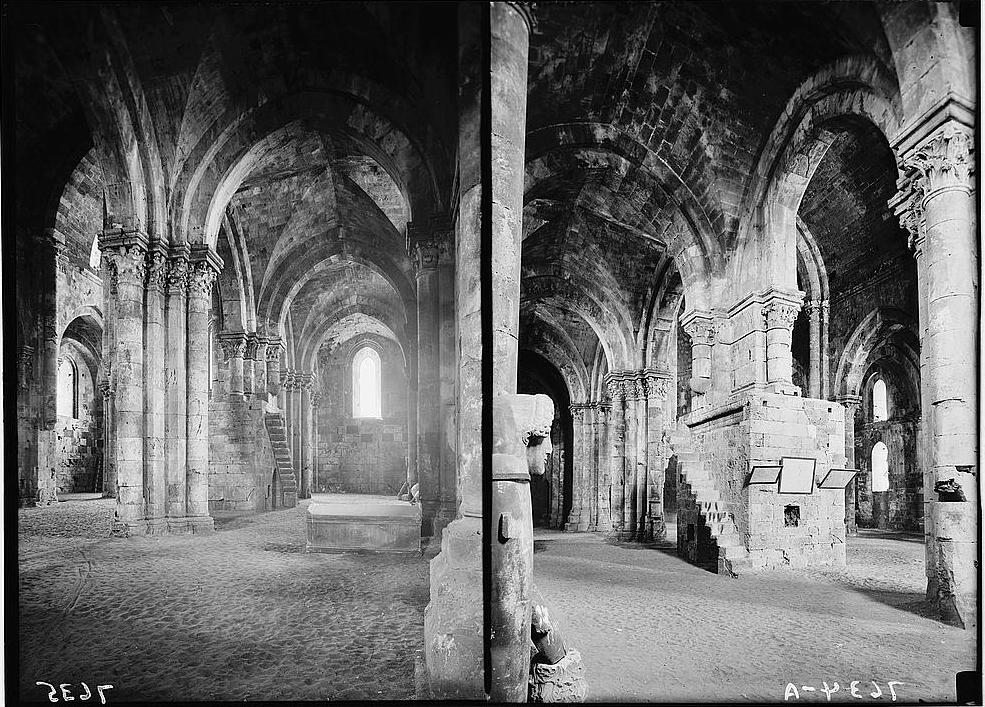
Interiors (1936).

The Cathedral of Our Lady of Tortosa (Arabic: كاتدرائية طرطوس) is a former Catholic cathedral in the city of Tartus, Syria. Erected during the 12th century, it has been described by historians as "the best-preserved religious structure of the Crusades." The cathedral was popular among pilgrims during the Crusades because Saint Peter was said to have founded a small church there dedicated to the Virgin Mary. After it was captured by the Mamluks, the cathedral was turned into a mosque. Today, the building serves as the National Museum of Tartus.

== History ==
The cathedral's sanctuary to the Virgin Mary was the site of many Christian pilgrimages during the Crusades, due to the belief since Byzantine rule that it was on the site of a church founded by St. Peter. Frankish forces captured Tortosa in 1099, during the First Crusade. Once the land was seized, the cathedral was built over the spot of a Byzantine church. From 1152 until 1291, the Knights Templar governed the area. While under control of the Knights Templar, an earthquake damaged the cathedral in 1202, but it was repaired soon after. In the 1260s, the church building was fortified to protect from Mamluk attacks.

In 1213, Raymond, the son of Bohemond IV, the Prince of Antioch, was killed in the Cathedral of Our Lady of Tortosa by the Assassins.

The cathedral fell under the control of the Mamluks after the Knights Templar abandoned Tortosa in 1291, and was converted into a mosque. Since 1956, the building has housed the National Museum of Tartus, which exhibits archaeology from the area.

== Architecture ==
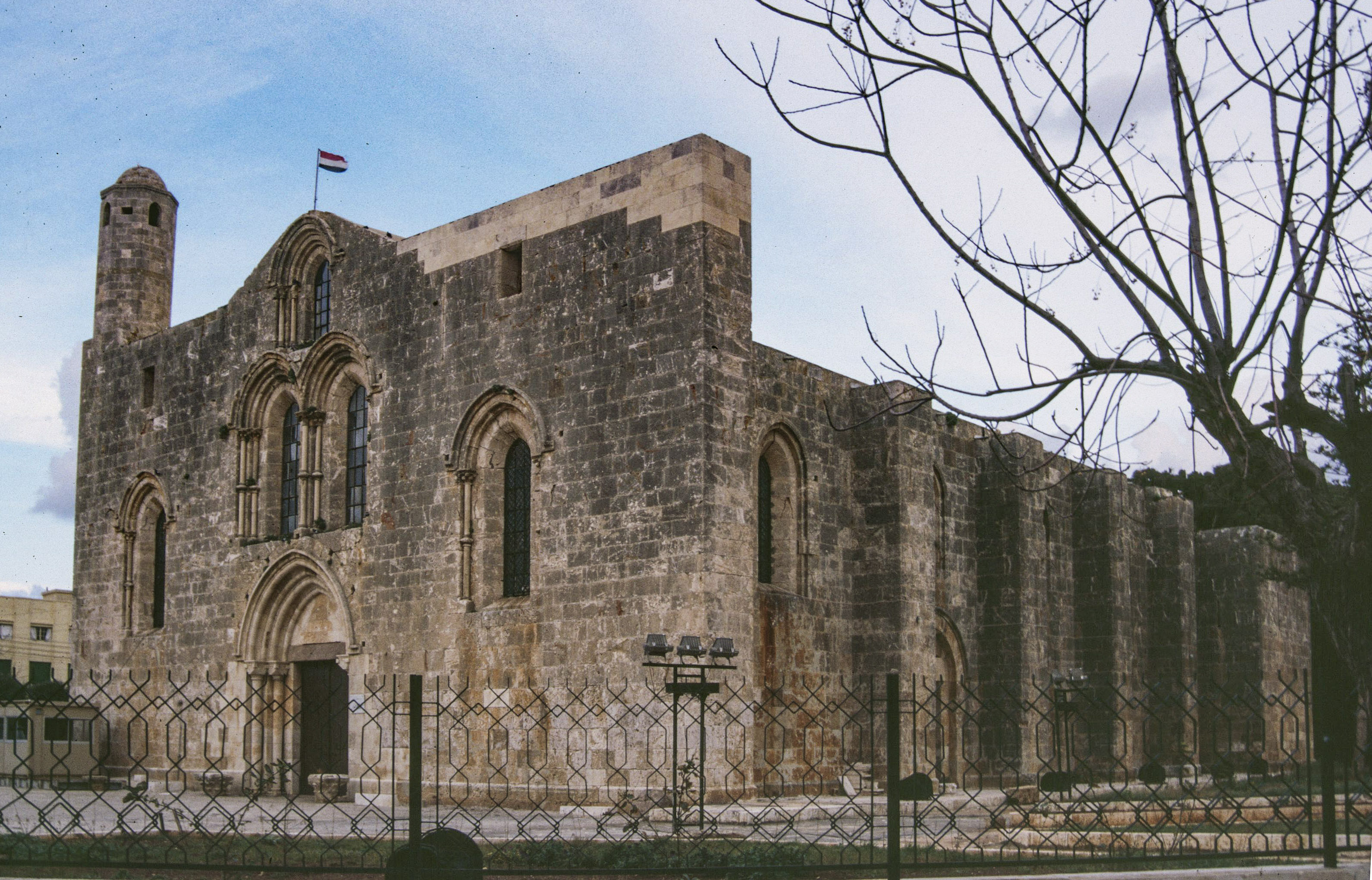
West façade and south walls.

The Cathedral of Our Lady of Tortosa was constructed from the mid-12th century to the 13th century. The eastern end was constructed first and reflected the Romanesque style. Later construction in the 13th century was in the Early Gothic style, as seen in the western end of the cathedral. The design was based on a standard basilica plan and is over 45 meters long and 30 meters wide. The nave is barrel-vaulted with a pointed arch. The shrine to the Virgin Mary is found on the north side of the nave. The north and south walls have buttresses projecting from them, but the west façade has none. The Gothic-influenced west façade has one polygonal bell tower and sets of single windows that illuminate the side aisles and nave.

Tortosa Cathedral is likely the only surviving fortified Latin church in the Middle East. Sacristies in the northeast and southeast corridors provided cover in the event of battle, and buttresses in the north and south walls had machicolations for defense. According to Camille Enlart, two towers were also built over the western aisle bays.
