= Tartus =

City in Syria

Tartus طَرْطُوس Tortosa
- City
- Tartous
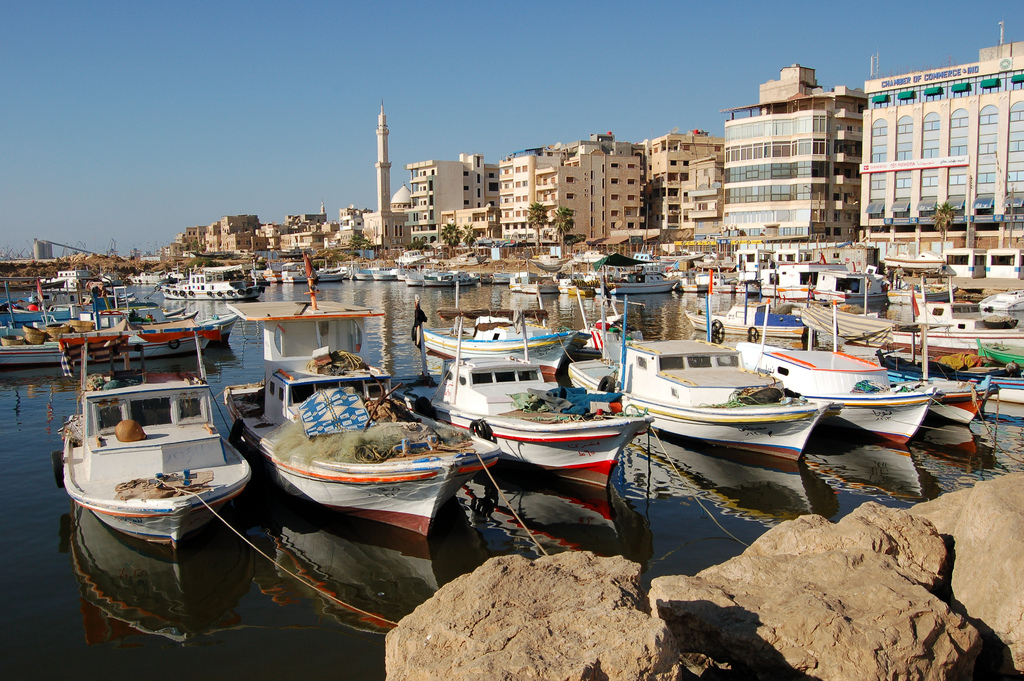
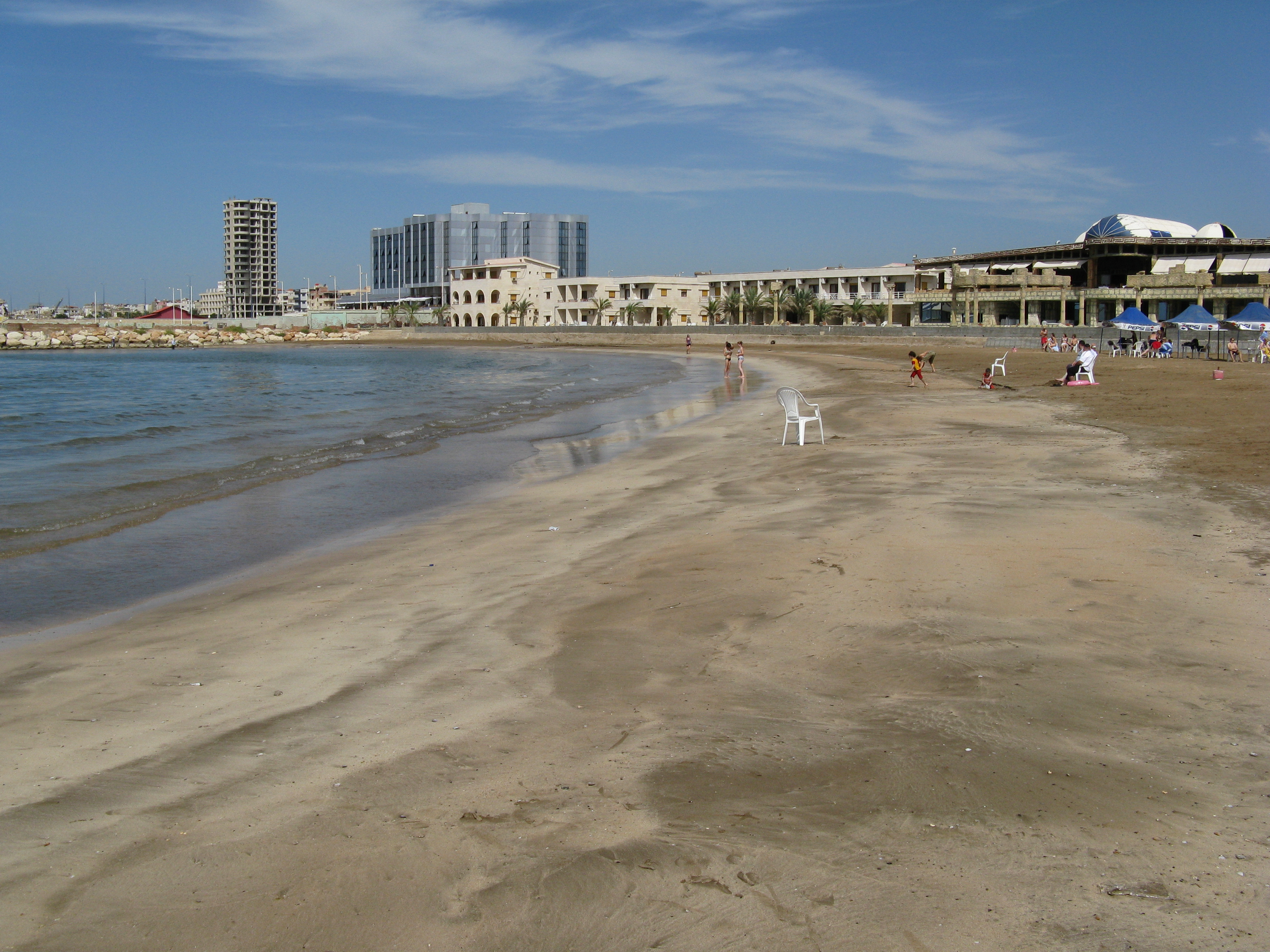
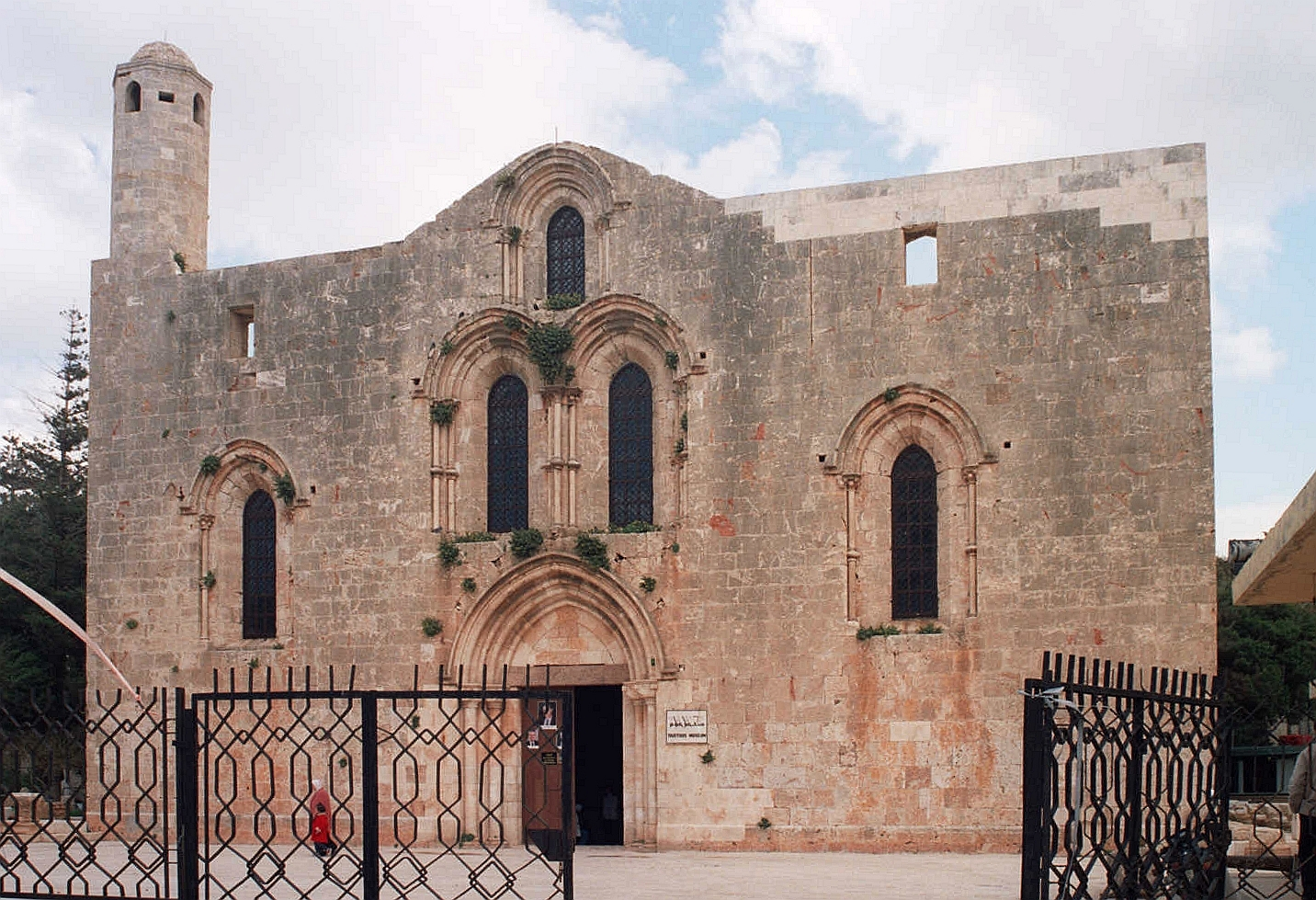
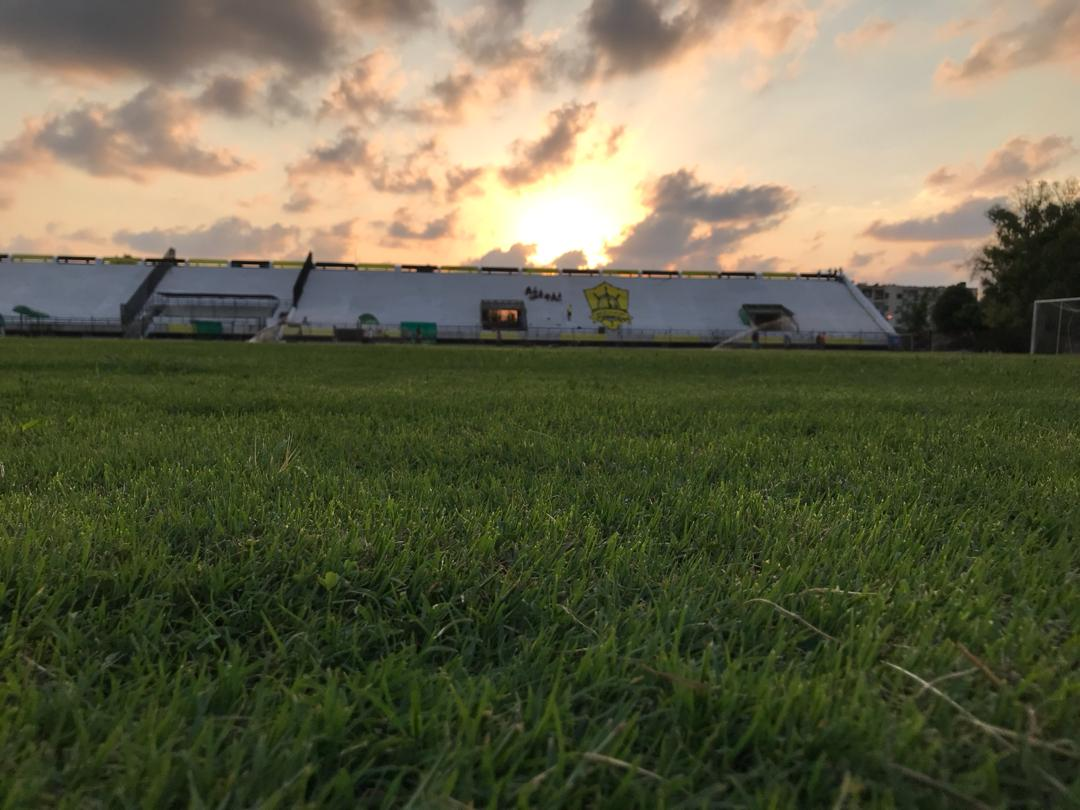
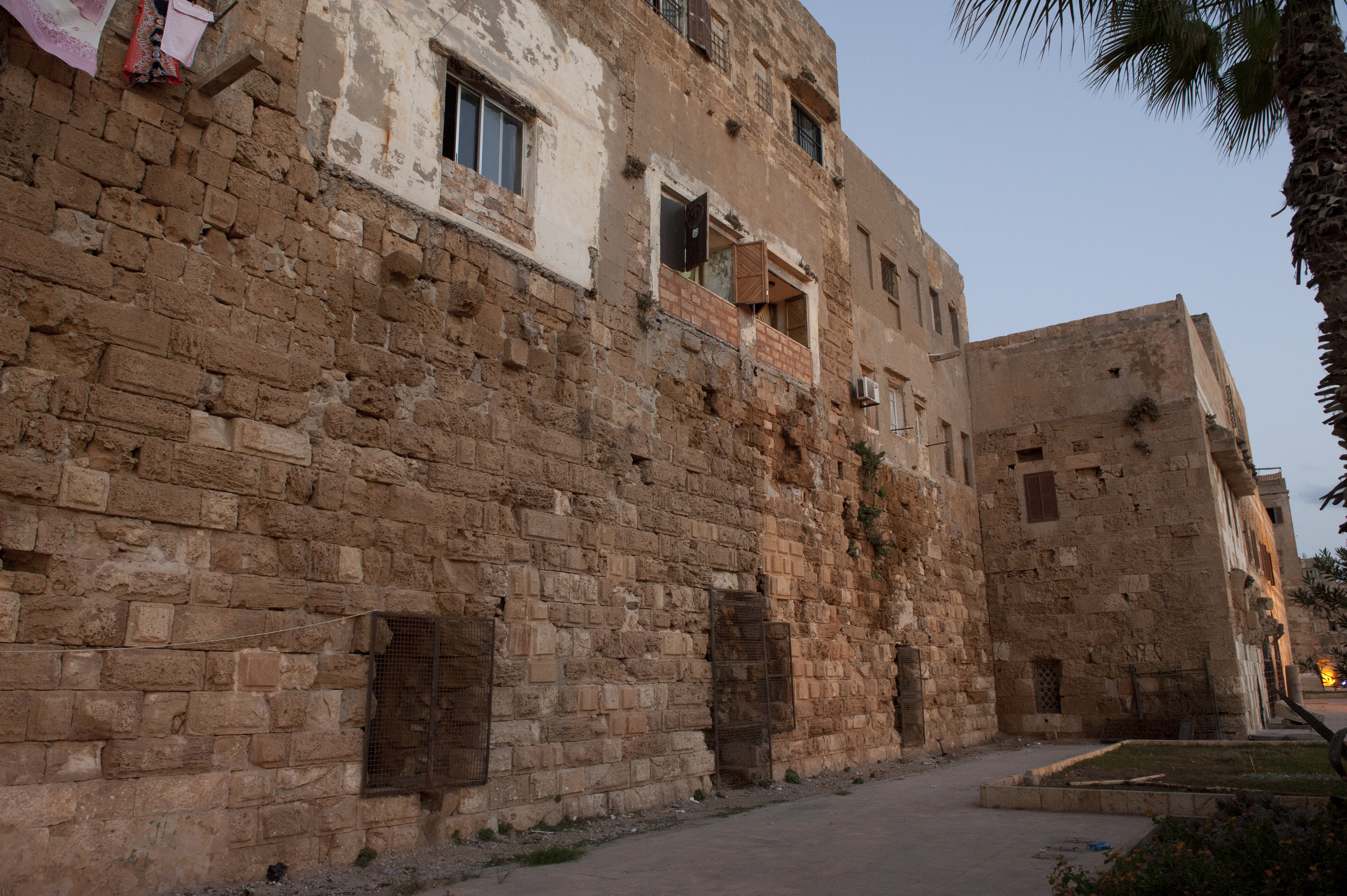
- Port of Tartus Tartus beach and boulevard Cathedral of Our Lady of Tortosa Tartus Stadium Citadel of Tartus

- Seal
- Nickname: Rope; (Arabic: حبل)
- Interactive map of Tartus
- Location in Syria Tartus (Eastern Mediterranean) Tartus (Asia)
- Coordinates: 34°53′N 35°53′E
- Country: Syria
- Governorate: Tartus Governorate
- District: Tartus District
- Subdistrict: Tartus Subdistrict
- Established: 2nd millennium BC
- Founder: Phoenicians

Area
  - Land: 20 km^{2} (7.7 sq mi)
- Elevation: 22 m (72 ft)

Population (2023 Estimate)
  - City: 458,327
  - Density: 23,000/km^{2} (59,000/sq mi)
  - Metro: 458,327
- Demonym(s): Arabic: طرطوسي, romanized: Ṭarṭūsi
- Time zone: UTC+3 (AST)
- Area codes: Country code: 963, City code: 43
- Geocode: C5221
- Climate: CSa
- Website: eTartus

Tartus (Arabic: طَرْطُوس / ALA-LC: Ṭarṭūs; also known as Tartous and also historically known in the County of Tripoli as Tortosa) is a major port city on the Mediterranean coast of Syria. It is the second largest port city in Syria (after Latakia), and the largest city in Tartus Governorate. Tartus was under the governance of Latakia Governorate until the 1970s, when it became a separate governorate. The population is 458,327 (2023 estimate). In the summer it is a vacation spot for many Syrians.

== Etymology ==
The name derives from Ancient Greek: Αντιάραδος, romanized: Anti-Arados (Antarados or Anti-Aradus, meaning "The town facing Aradus). In Latin, its name became Tortosa. The original name survives in its Arabic form as Ṭarṭūs (Arabic: طَرْطُوس), from which the French Tartous and English Tartus derive.

== History ==
=== Phoenician Antaradus ===
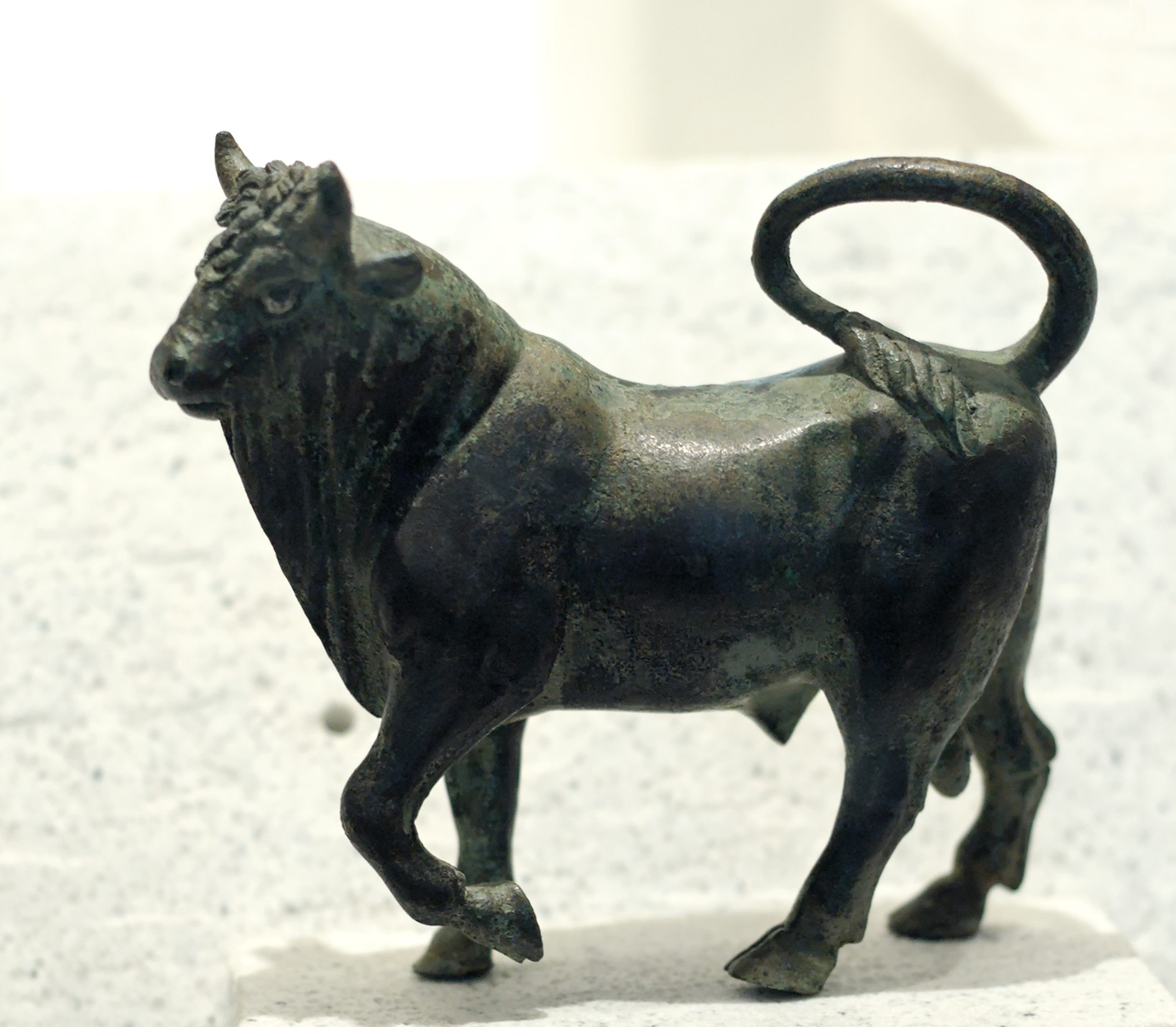
Bronze bull, probably a representation of Egyptian god Apis. 1st-2nd century CE, found in Tartus

Tartus was founded as a Phoenician colony of Aradus. The colony was known as Antaradus. Not much remains of the Phoenician Antaradus, the mainland settlement of the more important and larger settlements of Aradus, off the shore of Tartus, and the nearby site of Amrit.

=== Greco-Roman and Byzantine era ===
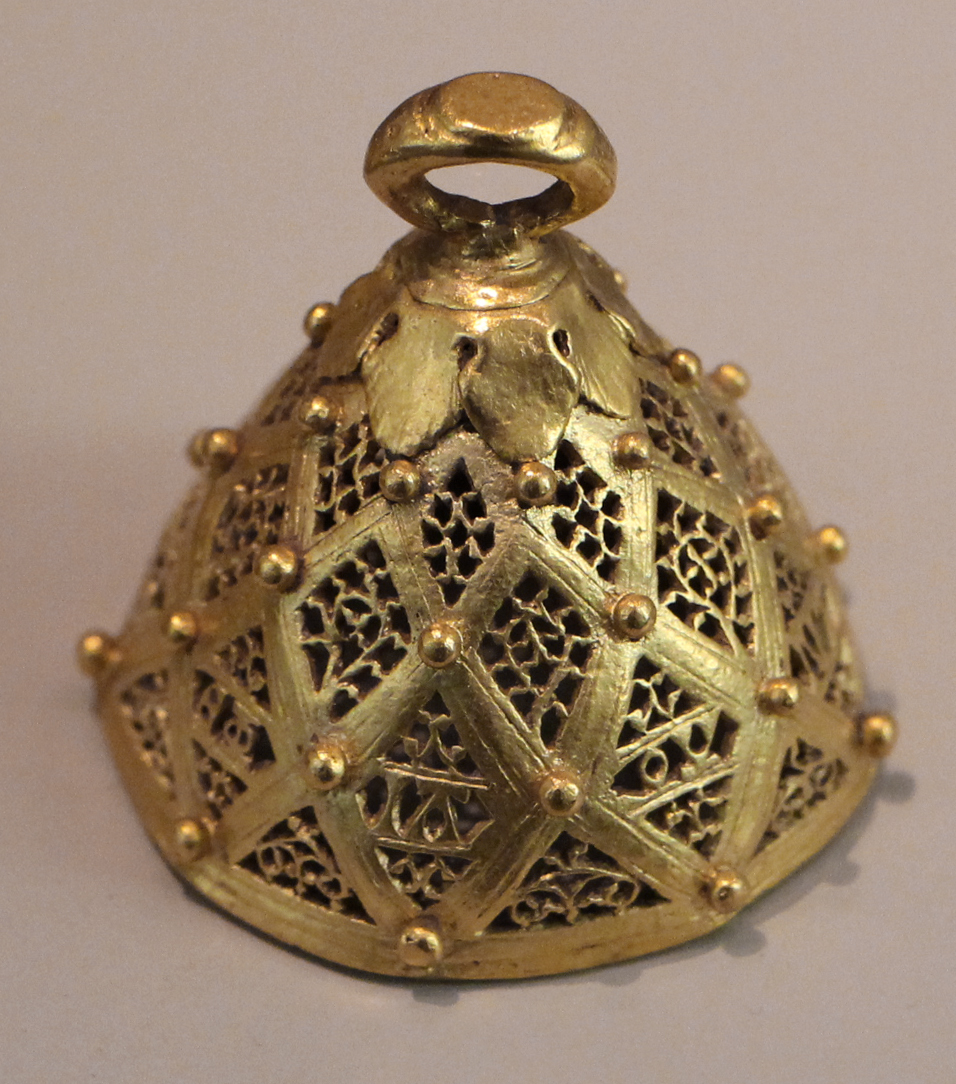
Greek gold fretworked bell, c. 390 AD

The city was called Antaradus in Latin. Athanasius reports that, under Roman Emperor Constantine the Great, Cymatius, the Christian Orthodox bishop of Antaradus and also of Aradus (whose names indicate that they were neighbouring towns facing each other) was driven out by the Arians. At the First Council of Constantinople in 381, Mocimus appears as bishop of Aradus. At the time of the Council of Ephesus (431), some sources speak of a Musaeus as bishop of Aradus and Antaradus, while others mention only Aradus or only Antaradus. Alexander was at the Council of Chalcedon in 451 as bishop of Antaradus, Paulus as bishop of Aradus, while, at a synod held at Antioch shortly before, Paulus took part as bishop of both Aradus and Antaradus. In 458, Atticus signed, as bishop of Aradus, the letter of the bishops of the province of Phoenicia Prima to Byzantine Emperor Leo I the Thracian protesting about the murder of Proterius of Alexandria. Theodorus or Theodosius, who died in 518, is mentioned as bishop of Antaradus in a letter from the bishops of the province regarding Severus of Antioch that was read at a synod held by Patriarch Mennas of Constantinople. The acts of the Second Council of Constantinople in 553 were signed by Asyncretius as bishop of Aradus. At the time of the Crusades, Antaradus, by then called Tartus or Tortosa, was a Latin Church diocese, whose bishop also held the titles of Aradus and Maraclea (perhaps Rachlea). It was united to the see of Famagosta in Cyprus in 1295.

No longer a residential bishopric, Antaradus is listed by the Catholic Church as a titular see.

The city was favoured by Constantine for its devotion to the cult of the Virgin Mary. The first chapel to be dedicated to the Virgin was built here in the 3rd century.

=== Early Islamic era ===
Islamic rule was established in Syria in 634. In the years before, Arab merchants would spread the word of Islam and locals embraced the new religion while others continued to practice their respective faiths. During the Arab conquest of the Levant, caliphate armies conquered Tartus under the leadership of Ubadah ibn al-Samit in 636. While Ubadah occupied Tartus, Mu'awiya I came to the city, and built an Amsar complex within the city, while also tasking fiefs to the garrison commanders. Tartus hosted Khadijah, the wife of Prophet Muhammad when she came with her father Khuwaylid ibn Asad.

=== Crusades ===
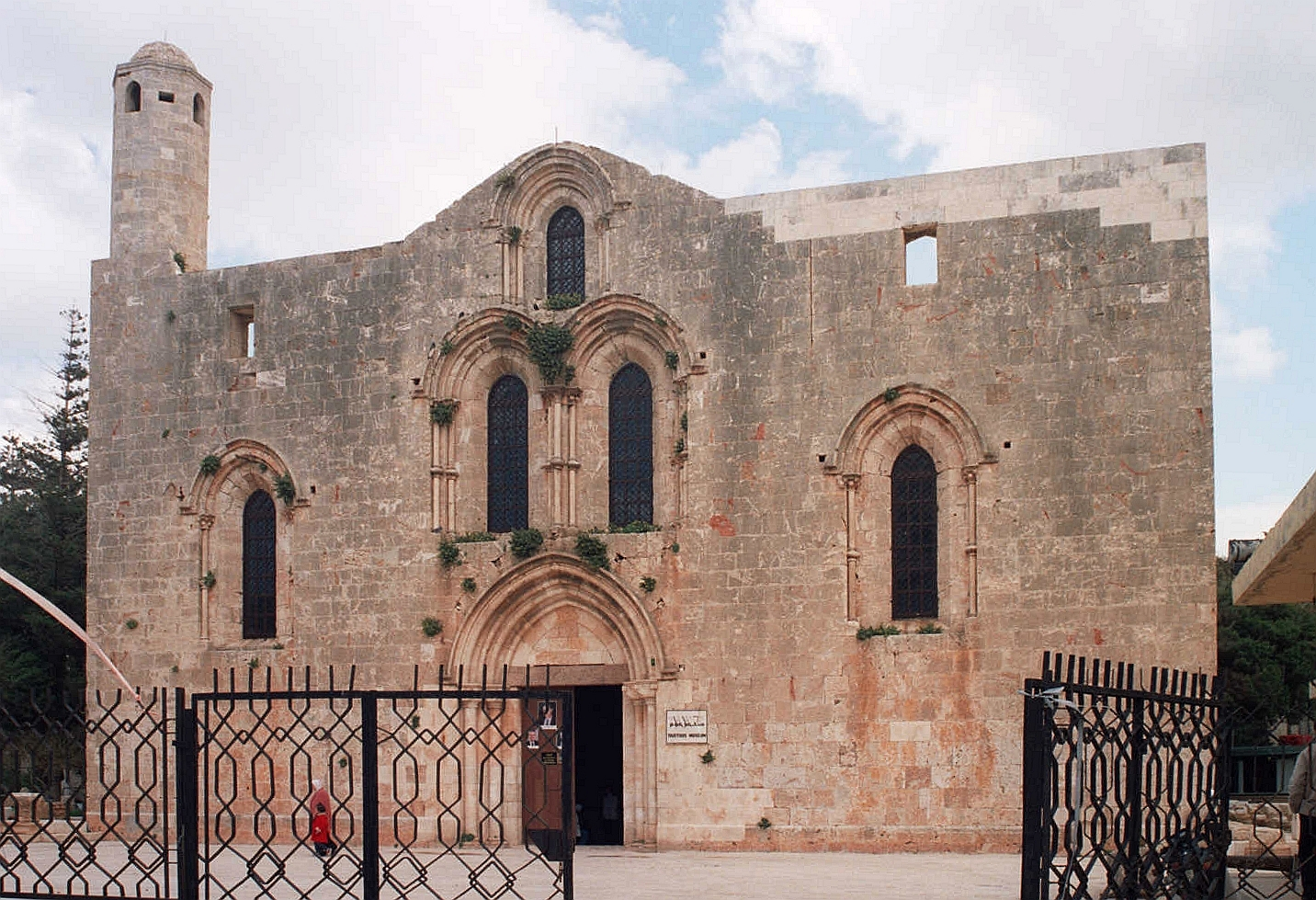
The Crusader-era cathedral of Our Lady of Tortosa, in Tartus, Syria

The Crusaders called the city Antartus, and also Tortosa. It was captured in 1099 during the First Crusade by Frankish forces. Once the land was seized, the cathedral was built over the spot of a Byzantine church, but it was later taken over by Muslims. It was recaptured by Raymond of Saint-Gilles in February 1102 after two weeks of siege, then it was left in 1105 to his son Alfonso Jordan and was known as Tortosa. In 1123 the Crusaders built the semi-fortified Cathedral of Our Lady of Tortosa over a Byzantine church that was popular with pilgrims.

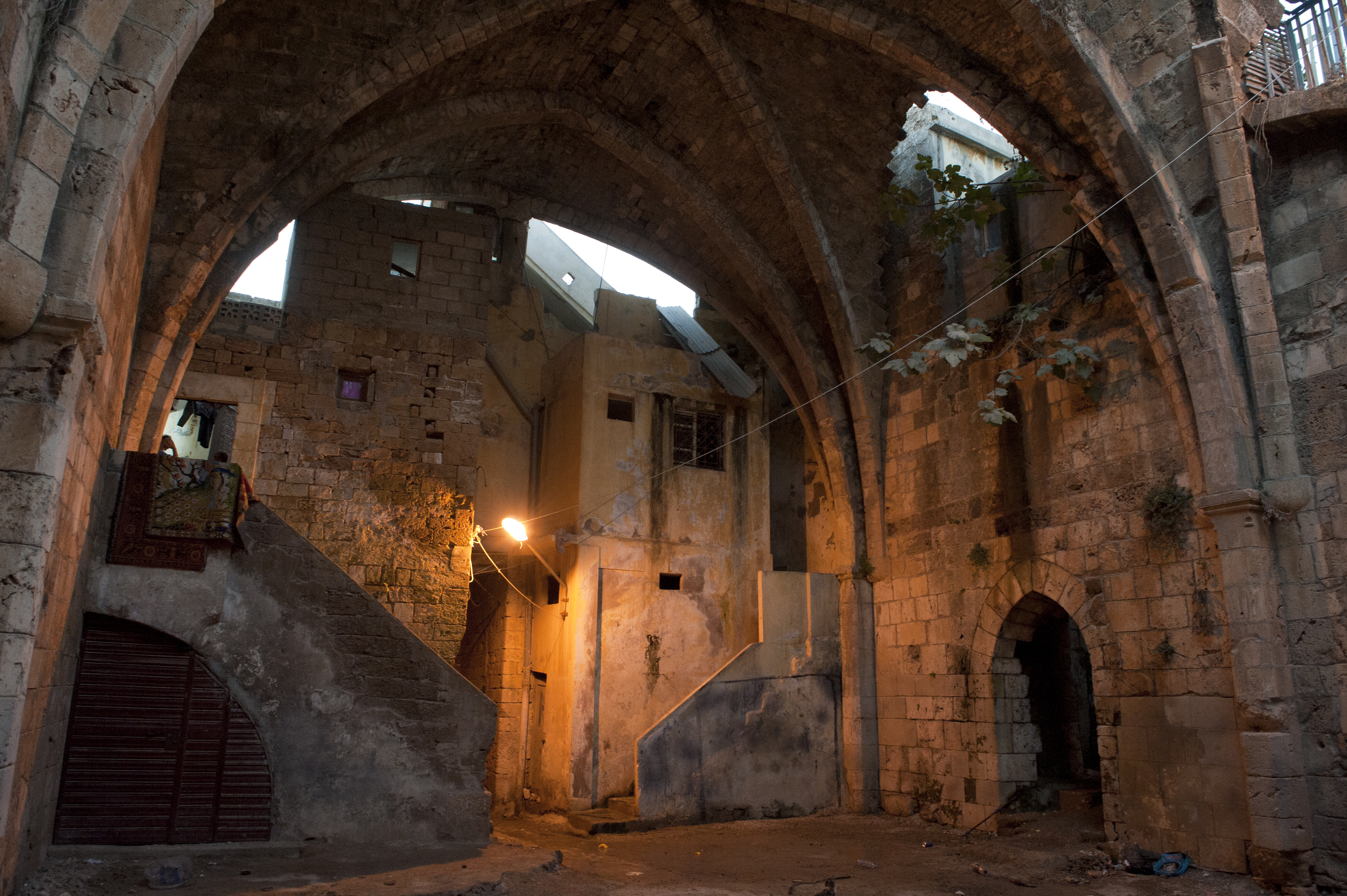
Templar Chapel, Citadel of Tartus, Syria

In 1152, Tortosa was handed to the Knights Templar, who used it as a military headquarters. They engaged in some major building projects, constructing a castle around 1165 with a large chapel and an elaborate keep, surrounded by thick double concentric walls. The Templars' mission was to protect the city and surrounding lands, some of which had been occupied by Christian settlers, from Muslim attack. Nur ad-Din Zangi captured Tartus from the Crusaders for a brief time before he lost it again.

The city of Tortosa was recaptured by Saladin in 1188, and the main Templar headquarters was relocated to Cyprus. However, in Tortosa, some Templars were able to retreat into the keep, which they continued to use as a base for the next 100 years. They steadily added to its fortifications until it also fell, in 1291. Tortosa was the last outpost of the Templars on the Syrian mainland, after which they retreated to a garrison on the nearby island of Arwad, which they held for another decade. After the occupation by the Mamluks, the city lost its prestige, which it regained only under the Ottoman rule.

=== Ottoman era ===
During the Ottoman rule, the city gained importance mainly due to trade with Cyprus and Europe. At the turn of the 18th and 19th centuries, it became one of the coastal defense points due to its strategic port. In 1832, at the beginning of the First Egyptian-Ottoman War, the city and its surroundings were conquered by Muhammad Ali Pasha, then ruler of Egypt.

In 1839, the Ottoman Empire reconquered its Syrian coastal territories from Egypt with the support of Great Britain. In 1840, during the Syrian War, British frigates HMS Carysfort, HMS Benbow and HMS Zebra, with the help of a landing force of marines, attacked the citadel in Tartus. Despite heavy losses, the British failed to capture the fort. Ottoman rule continued until 1918.

=== Modern era ===
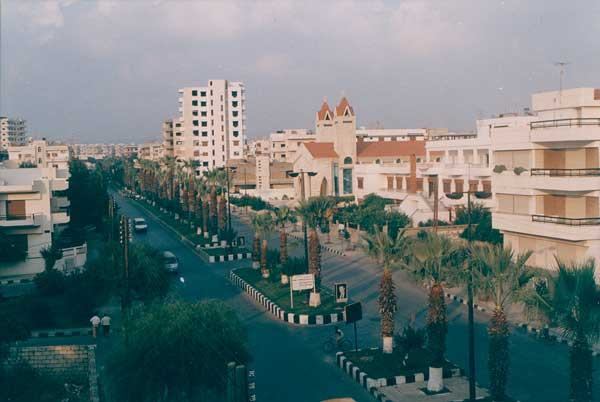
Hamrat street, Tartus (1970)

On May 23, 2016, the Islamic State of Iraq and the Levant claimed responsibility for three suicide bombings at a bus station in Tartus, which had remained largely unaffected since the Syrian Civil War began in 2011, as a stronghold of the Government of Syria. Purportedly targeting Alawite gatherings, the bombs killed 48 people. In Jableh, similarly insulated, another four bombers killed over a hundred people.

As part of the 2024 Syrian opposition offensives, Tartus fell under control of HTS forces on 9 December 2024, in the wake of the collapse of Bashar al-Assad's government.

On December 15, 2024, Israeli Air Forces bombed the coastal city and its vicinity in an offensive which targeted military facilities following the fall of the Assad regime. At 11:49 pm, a 3.1 earthquake which might have been caused by the explosions was reported with its epicenter about 28 kilometres (17 mi) off the coast of Baniyas, according to seismic sensors in the region. The Syrian Observatory for Human Rights has reported that the strikes were "some of the heaviest in the region since 2012".

== Geography ==
The city lies on the eastern coast of the Mediterranean Sea bordered by the Syrian Coastal Mountain Range to the east. Arwad, the only inhabited island on the Syrian coast, is located a few kilometers off the shore of Tartus. Tartus occupies most of the coastal plain, surrounded to the east by mountains composed mainly of limestone and, in certain places around the town of Souda, basalt.

=== Climate ===
Tartus has a Mediterranean climate (Köppen (Csa) with mild, wet winters, hot and humid summers, and short transition periods in April and October. The hills to the east of the city create a cooler climate with higher rainfall. Tartus is known for its relatively mild weather and high precipitation compared to inland Syria.

Climate data for Tartus
Month	Jan	Feb	Mar	Apr	May	Jun	Jul	Aug	Sep	Oct	Nov	Dec	Year
Mean daily maximum °C (°F)	15.8 (60.4)	16.4 (61.5)	18.6 (65.5)	21.9 (71.4)	24.8 (76.6)	27.3 (81.1)	29.2 (84.6)	30.0 (86.0)	29.2 (84.6)	26.6 (79.9)	22.4 (72.3)	17.9 (64.2)	23.34 (74.01)
Daily mean °C (°F)	12.0 (53.6)	12.7 (54.9)	14.7 (58.5)	17.6 (63.7)	20.3 (68.5)	23.9 (75.0)	26.0 (78.8)	26.7 (80.1)	25.1 (77.2)	21.9 (71.4)	17.7 (63.9)	13.7 (56.7)	19.36 (66.85)
Mean daily minimum °C (°F)	8.4 (47.1)	8.9 (48.0)	10.4 (50.7)	12.8 (55.0)	15.6 (60.1)	19.1 (66.4)	22.2 (72.0)	22.8 (73.0)	20.4 (68.7)	16.9 (62.4)	13.2 (55.8)	10.0 (50.0)	15.06 (59.11)
Average rainfall mm (inches)	177.5 (6.99)	142.1 (5.59)	105.2 (4.14)	57.1 (2.25)	20.0 (0.79)	12.3 (0.48)	0.7 (0.03)	3.8 (0.15)	8.2 (0.32)	67.6 (2.66)	105.0 (4.13)	184.8 (7.28)	884.3 (34.81)
Average rainy days (≥ 1.0 mm)	12.5	10.2	9.3	5.4	2.1	0.5	0.1	0.1	0.8	4.4	6.5	11.0	62.9
Source: Hong Kong Observatory

== Economy ==
=== Industry ===
There is a cement plant in the city with a production capacity of 6.5 thousand tons of cement per day. The pharmaceutical industry is also represented in the city, since the beginning of the conflict in the country, seven pharmaceutical factories have been opened and another 3 are under construction. Food, chemical and wood processing industries are also represented in the urban industrial zone.

Many residents are employed in the service sector.

=== Tartus port ===
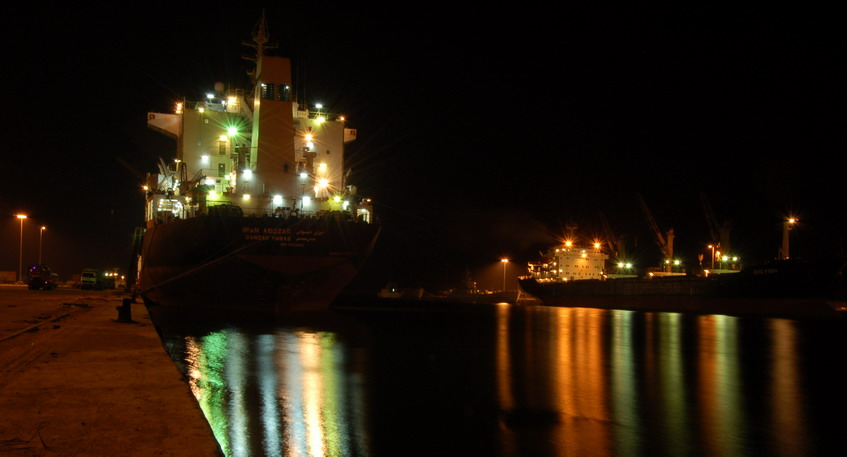
Tartus port

Tartus is an important trade center in Syria and has one of the two main ports of the country on the Mediterranean. In 2005, the city port underwent major expansion as a lot of Iraqi imports come through the port of Tartus to aid reconstruction efforts in Iraq.

In January 2025, the post-Assad government of Syria canceled Russian company Stroytransgaz's contract to operate the commercial port of Tartus. In July 2025, Syria concluded an $800 million deal with Dubai-based DP World to redevelop Tartus port as part of post-war reconstruction efforts. The contract was signed in Damascus between DP World and the General Authority for Land and Sea Ports, in the presence of Syrian president Ahmed al-Sharaa.

=== Russian naval base ===
Tartus hosts a Soviet-era naval supply and maintenance base, under a 1971 agreement with Syria, which is still staffed by Russian naval personnel. Tartus is the last Russian military base outside the former Soviet Union, and its only Mediterranean fueling spot, sparing Russia's warships the trip back to their Black Sea bases through straits in Turkey, a NATO member.

=== Tourism ===
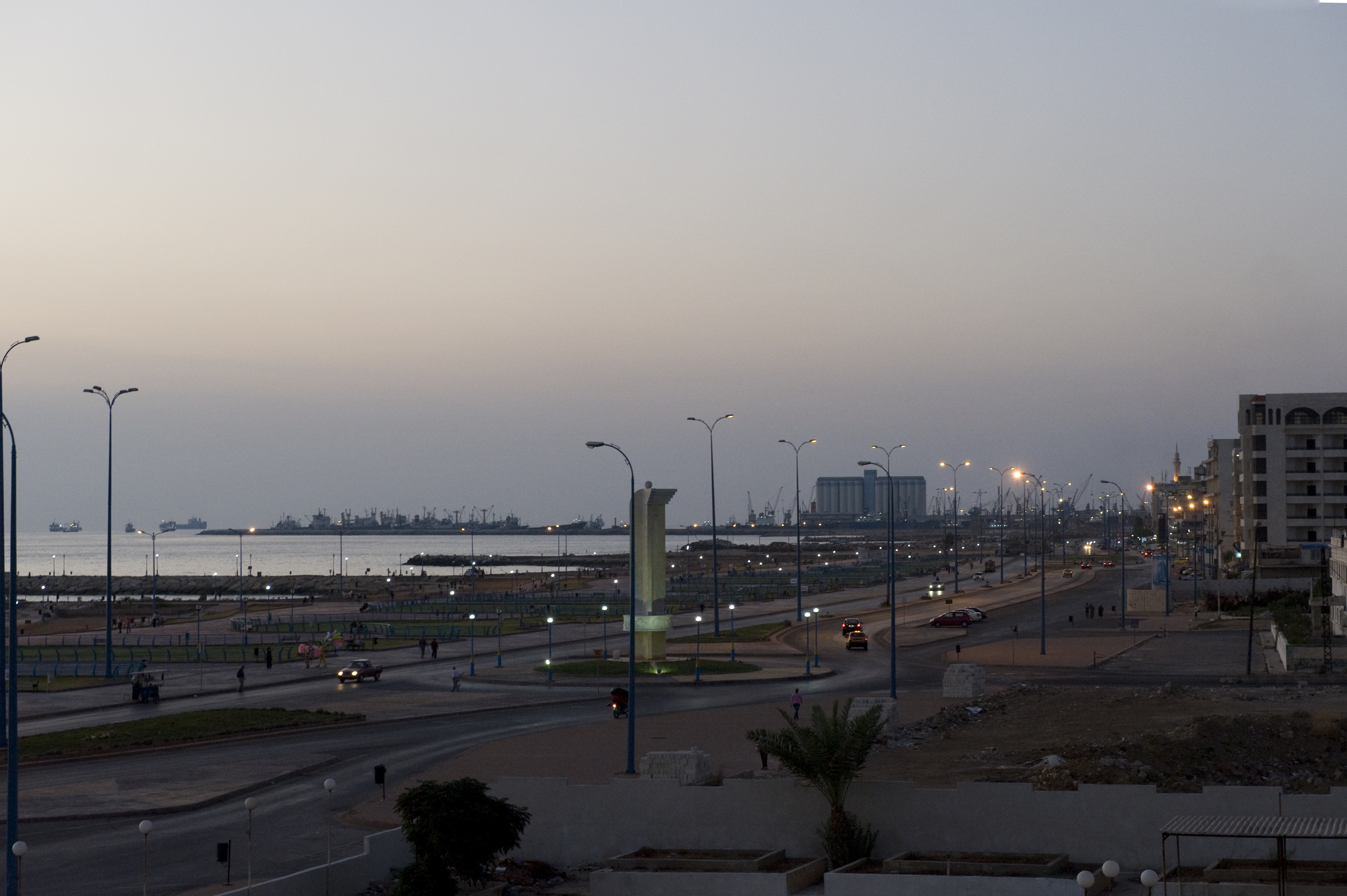
City promenade at night

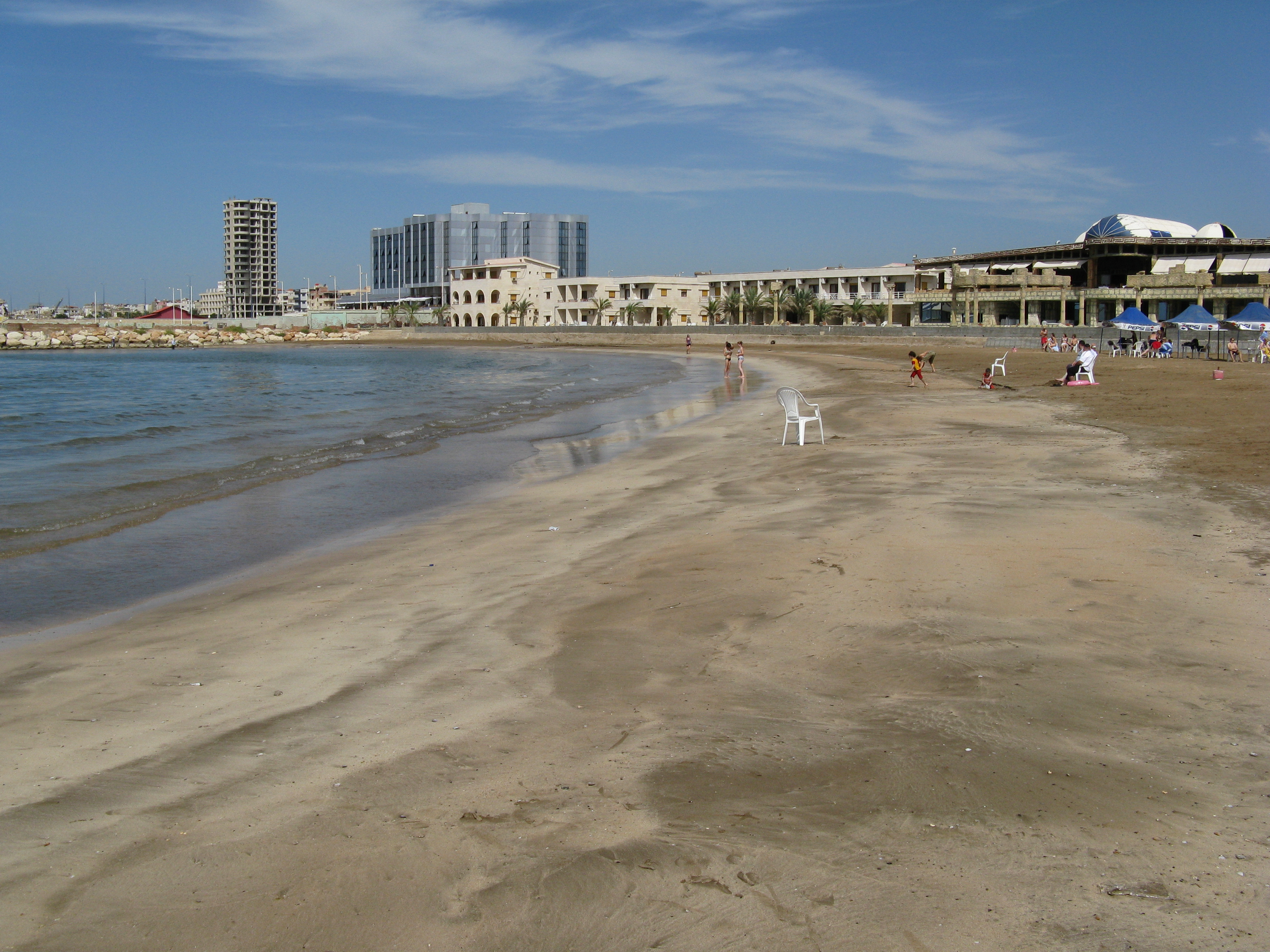
Tartus beaches

Tartus is a popular destination for tourists with many resorts along the Syrian coast.

== Culture ==
=== Art and festivals ===
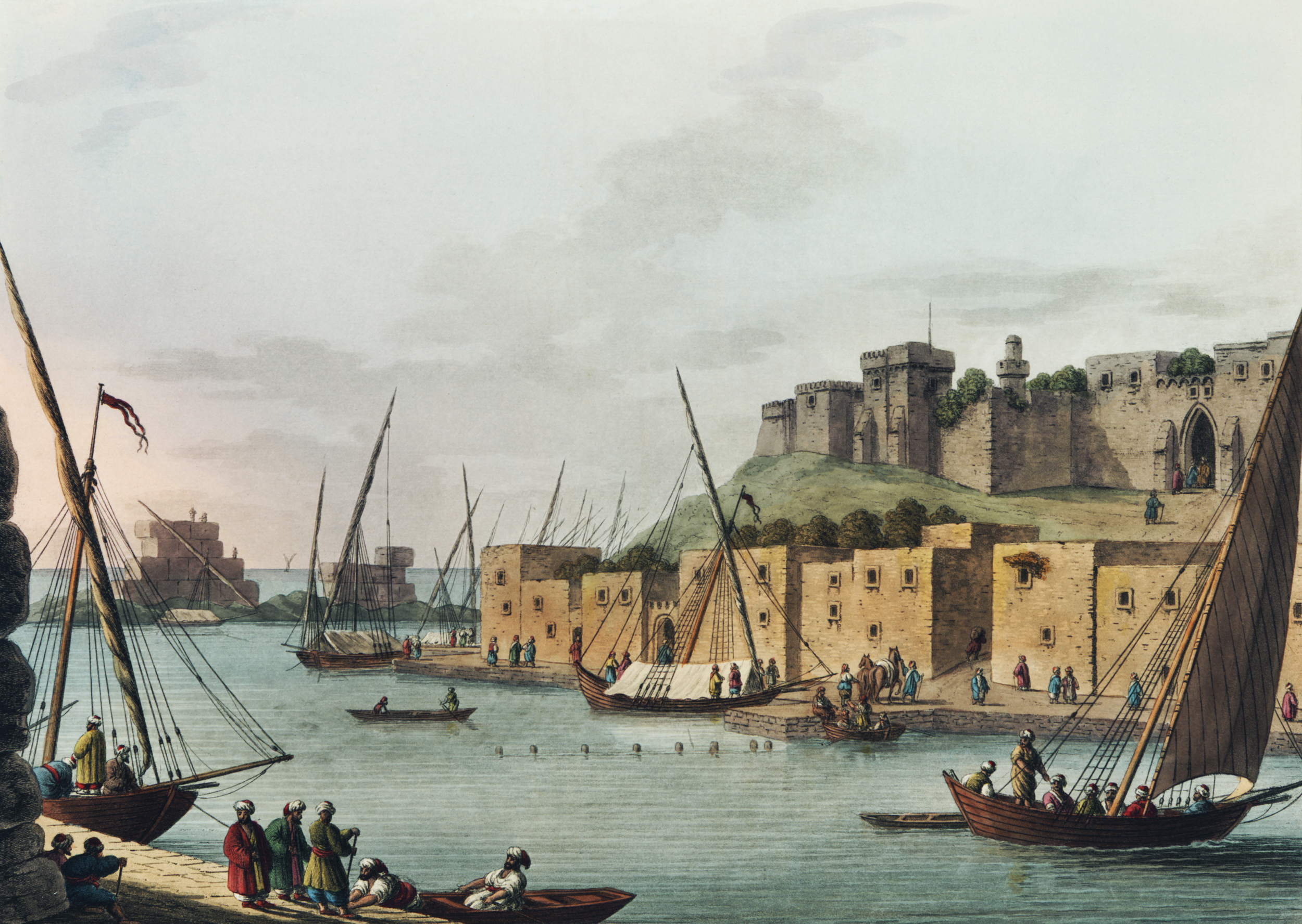
Tartus painted by Luigi Mayer (1810)

Many cultural and literary events, art festivals and theater are held in the city, and in the summer, the activities of the Tartous Art Festival are held in the presence of distinguished Syrian and Arab artists, in addition to a tourist festival called Antaradus.

Assi Rahbani and Mansour Rahbani, frequent visitors to Tartus, immortalized their love for the city in a song, Shabab Al-Hilweh, sung by Nasri Shamseddine. Among the composers whose name is associated with Tartous and Husayn al-Baher is the musician Safwan Bahlawan Ibn Arwad who has a distinguished performance in the pub and his artistic presence on the Arab art scene. Residents of the city include the singer Farrah Yousef, finalist of the singing competition Arab Idol and Taim Hasan, an actor known for his dramatic roles in Syria and the Arab world.

Many poets and writers have lived in Tartus, including Saadallah Wannous, Muhammad Omran, Rasha Omran and Nadim Muhammad. Some writers hold their literary seminars and lectures in the local cultural center.

=== Museum ===
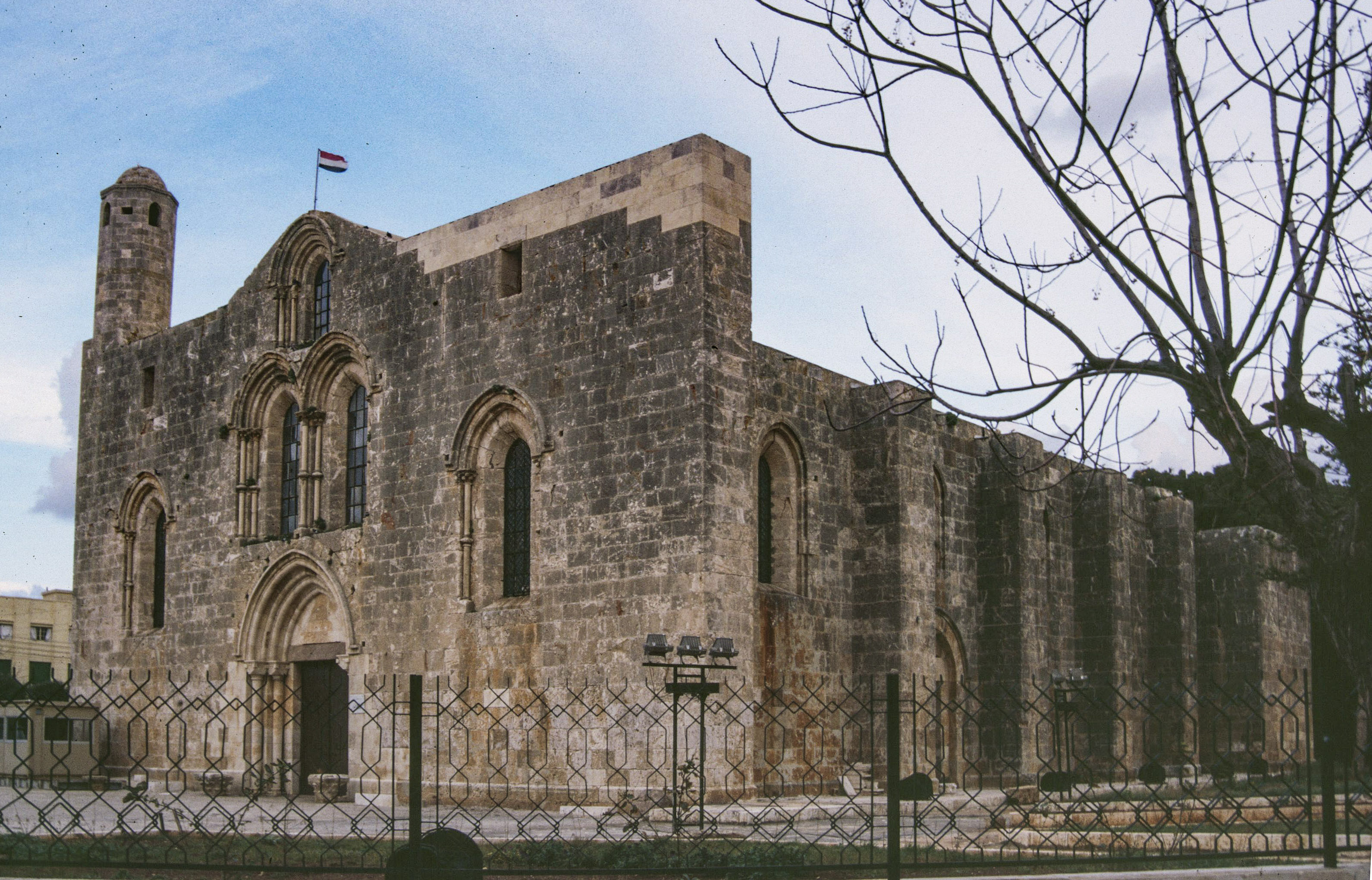
National Museum of Tartus (1987)

St. Mary's Cathedral was originally built in the 12th century as a Templar church. The cathedral was used as a mosque after the Muslim capture of the city, then as a barracks by the Ottomans. It was renovated under the French Mandate and since 1956, the building has housed the National Museum of Tartus, which exhibits antiquities recovered from Amrit and many other places in the region.

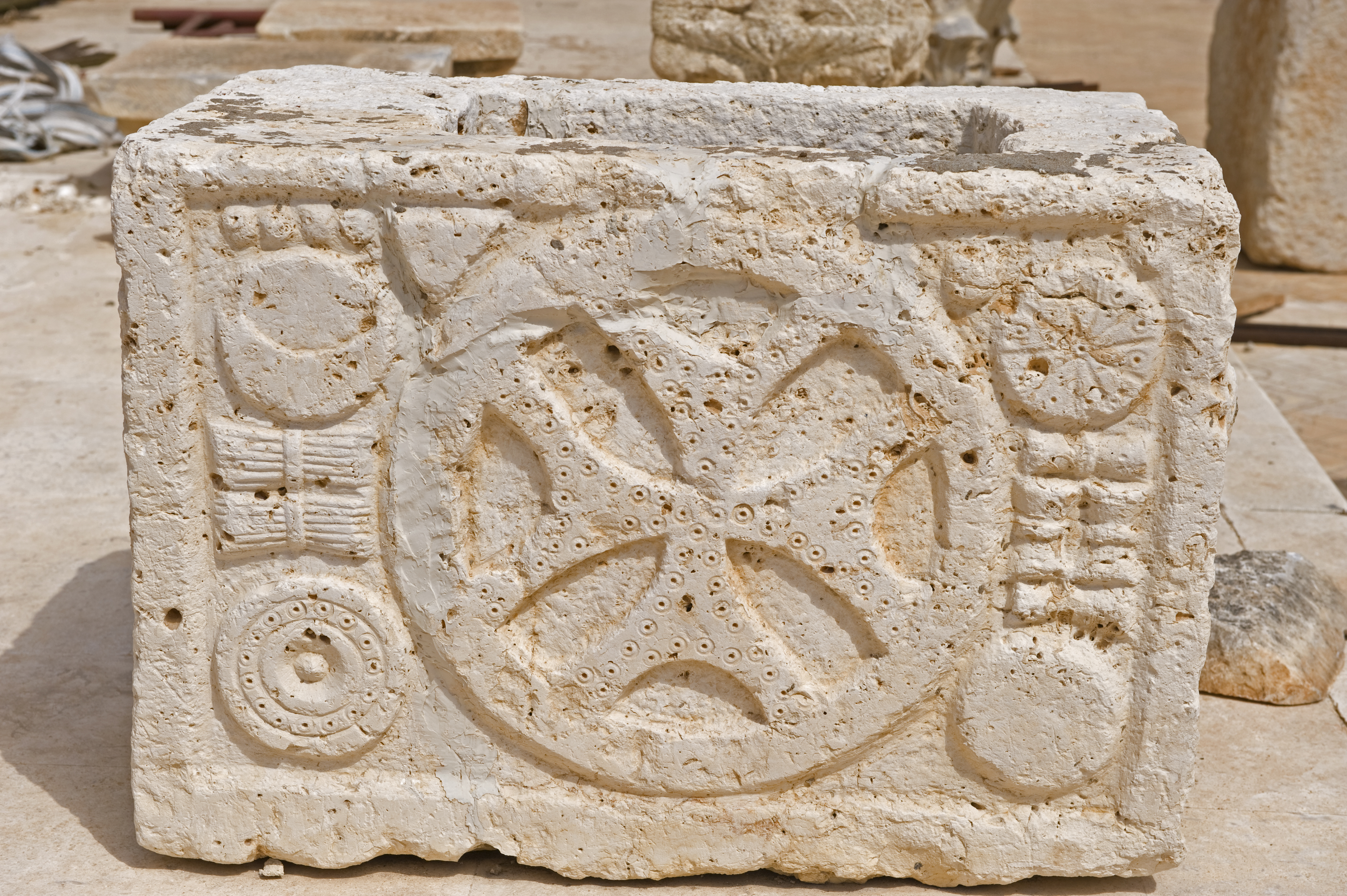
Ash chest with a Christian symbol, located in the national museum

In September 2021, the Directorate-General of Antiquities began a comprehensive renovation and fixing operations of architectural elements that were subjected to fragmentation at the National Museum of Tartus.

=== Sports ===
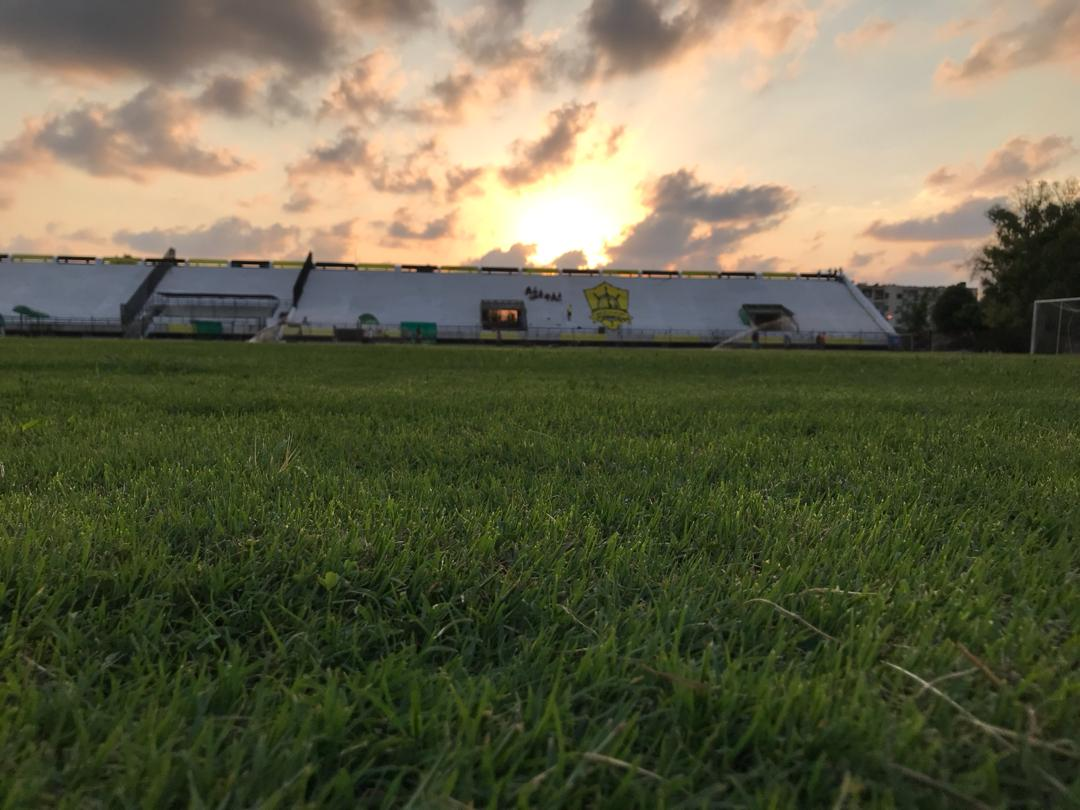
Sports Hall Stadium

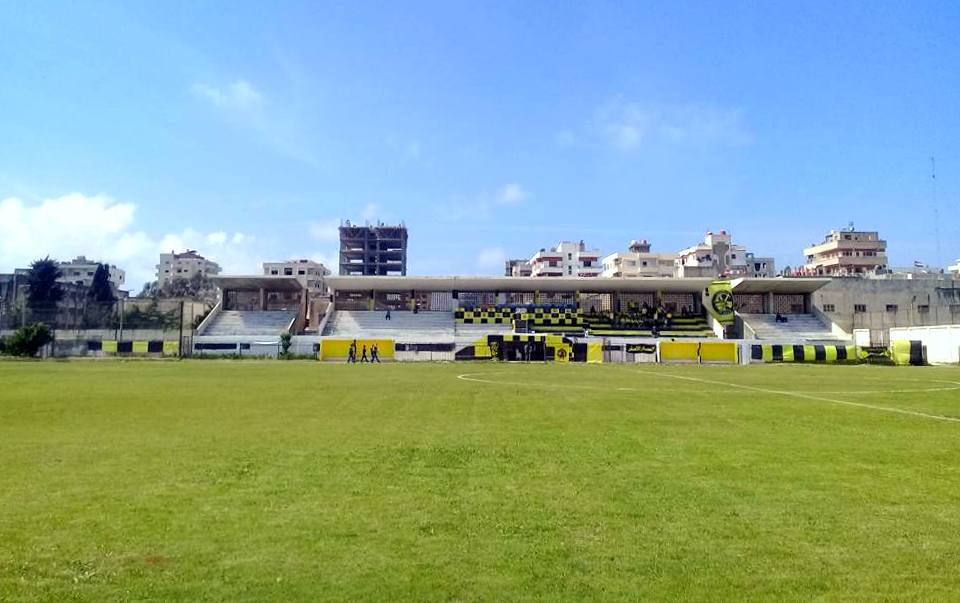
Tartus Municipal Stadium

Tartus is the home city of only one sports club: Al-Sahel SC, founded in 1971. 4 types of sports are being practiced by the club including: football, basketball, table tennis and bodybuilding. The club plays in both stadiums in the city: Municipal (capacity 1,300) and Sports Hall (capacity 8,000).

In 2018, Al-Sahel was promoted to the Syrian Premier League for the first time in their history. In the 2020-21 season, they were relegated and have been playing in the Syrian League 1st Division ever since. The women's basketball team competes at the top level of the Syrian basketball league.

== Education ==
A number of colleges affiliated with Latakia University, such as the College of Arts and the College of Technical Engineering, were opened as part of the government's policy to expand higher education among the various Syrian cities. The city also has a number of institutes, secondary schools and primary schools affiliated with the Ministry of Education, in addition to private educational institutes and secondary schools.

== Local infrastructure ==
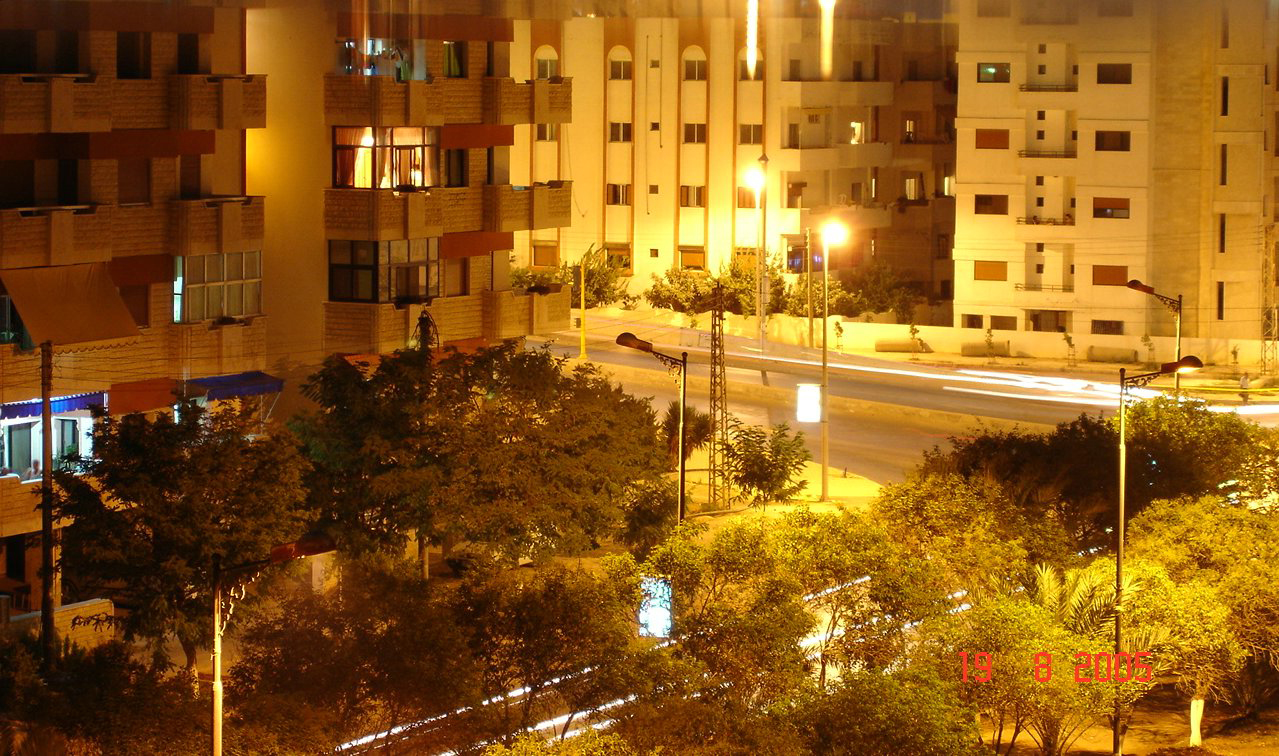
A residential neighbourhood of Tartus

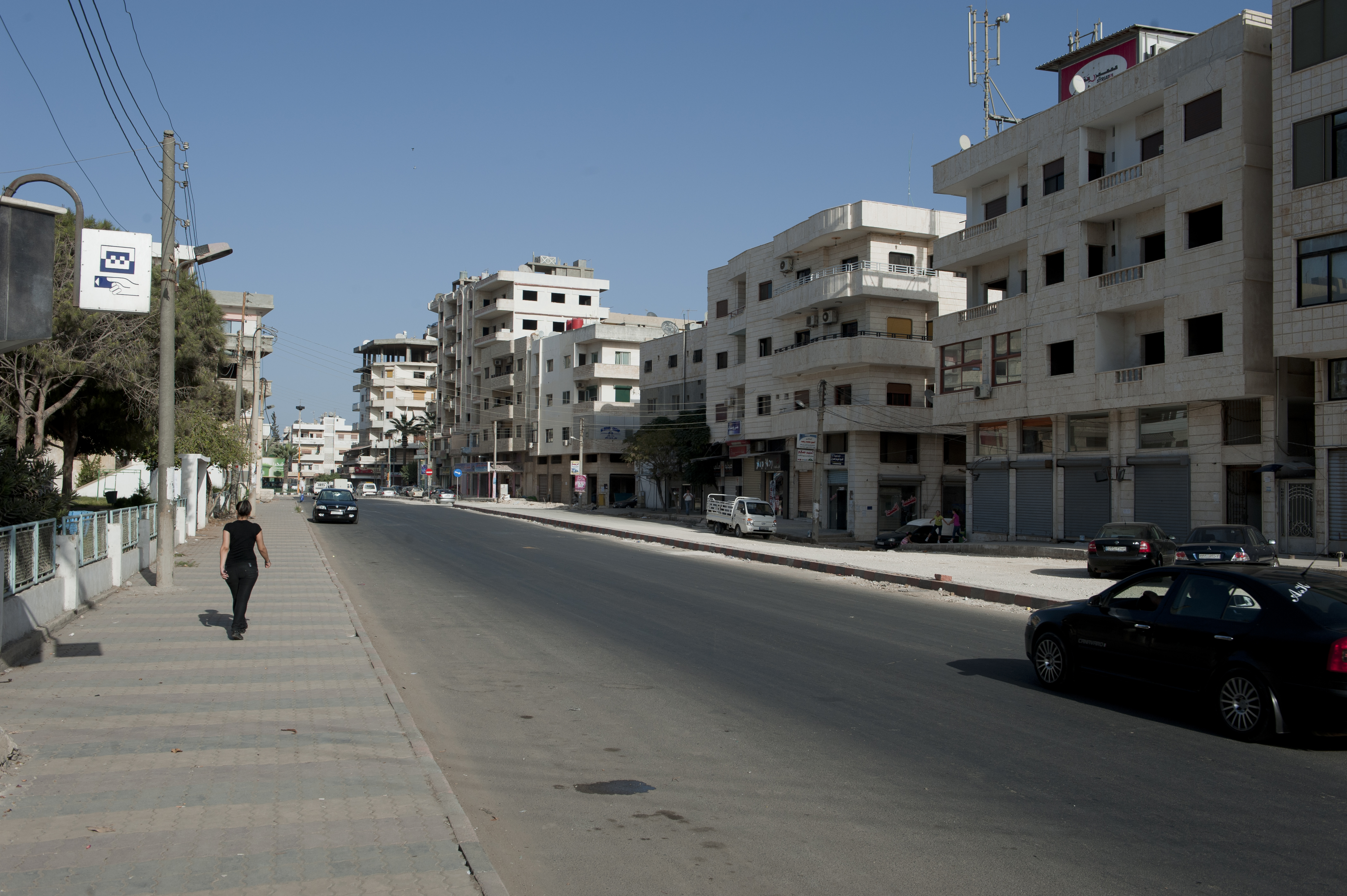
Downtown Tartus

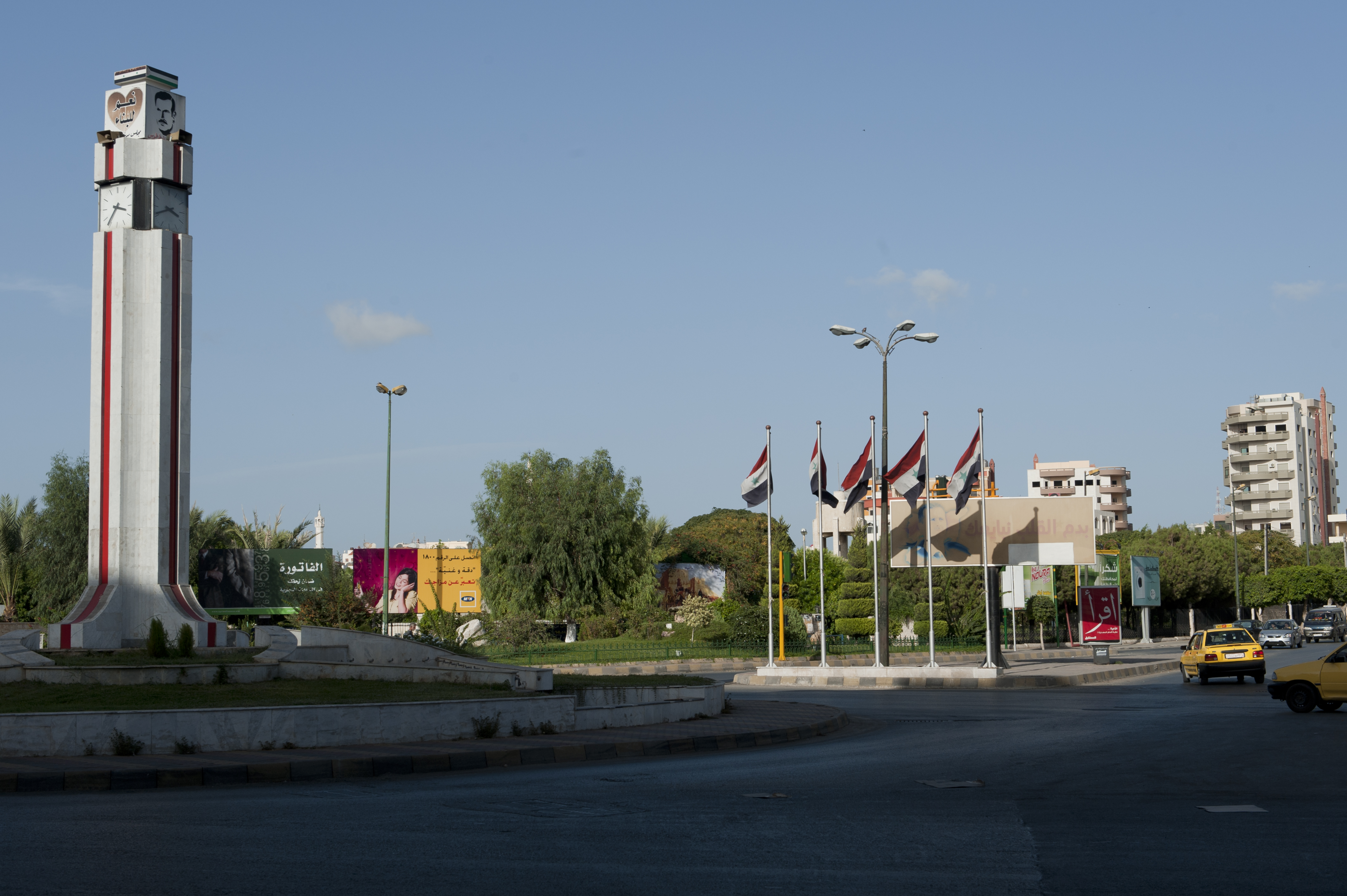
Tartus Public Park in the city center

Tartus has expanded over time. Gardens in the city include Tartus Park. Tartus was an attractive destination for tourists from Europe and Arab countries prior to the civil war.

=== Transportation ===
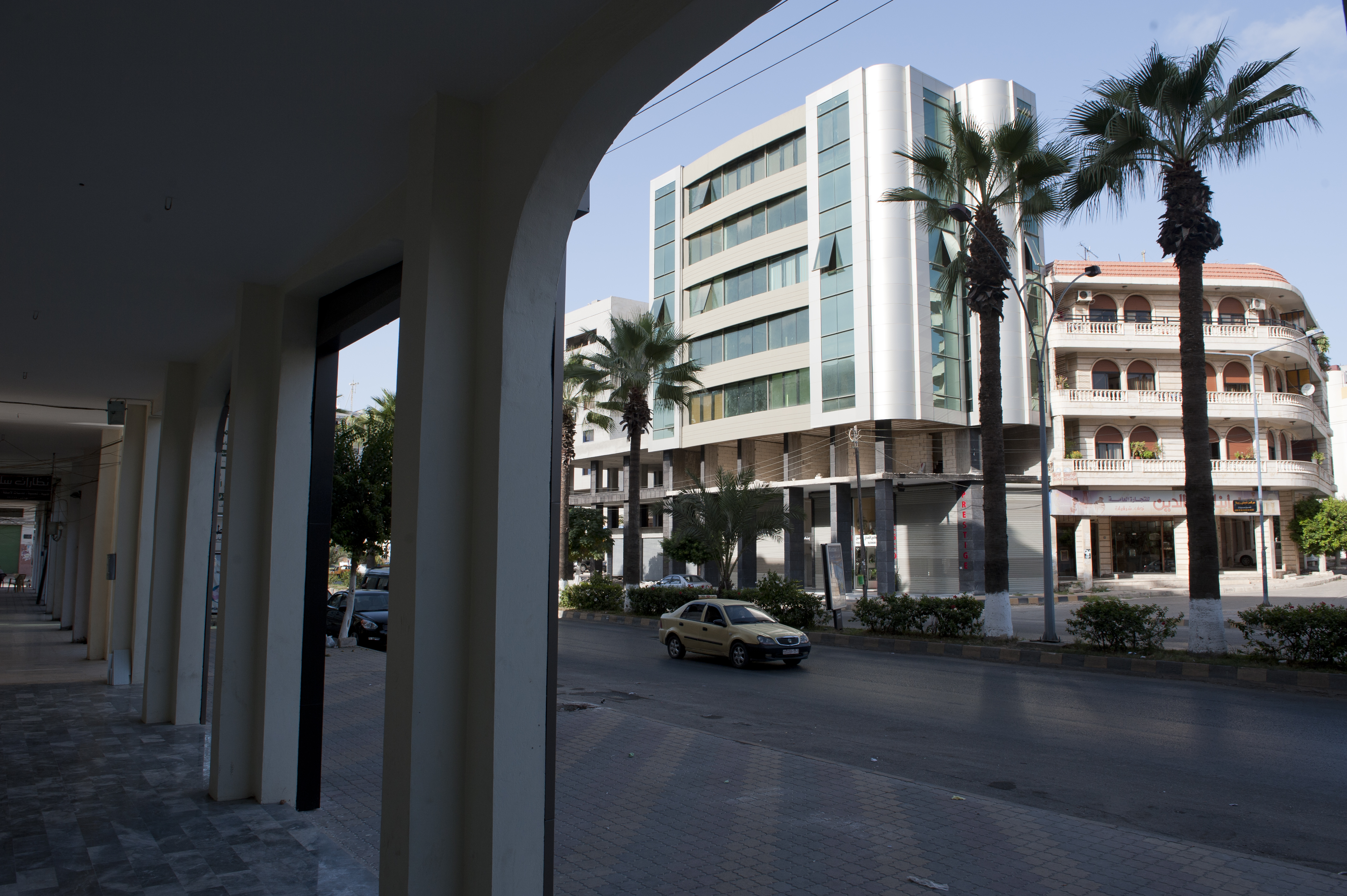
Al-Thawra Street

Tartus has a developed road system. Tartus and Latakia are connected by the M1 international highway, and the city is connected to Damascus by the M5 highway via Homs. The establishment of an international road linking Tartus with Iraq and other Arab states of the Persian Gulf through the Syrian Desert was recently studied, as it is the shortest road connecting the Persian Gulf to the Mediterranean and thus Europe from the Port of Tartus. The main commercial coastal road of the city is Al-Thawra Street, named after 1963 March Revolution.

The railway network operated by Syrian Railways connects Tartus with other cities in Syria, although currently only the Latakia-Tartus and Tartus-Al Akkari-Homs passenger connections are in service. The restoration of the rail link with Iraq (IRR) and the proposal to extend the railway from Al-Qaim in Iraq through Al-Bukamal in Syria to Homs for a total distance of 270 kilometers and thence to Tartus are currently (2022) under discussion.

== Main sights ==
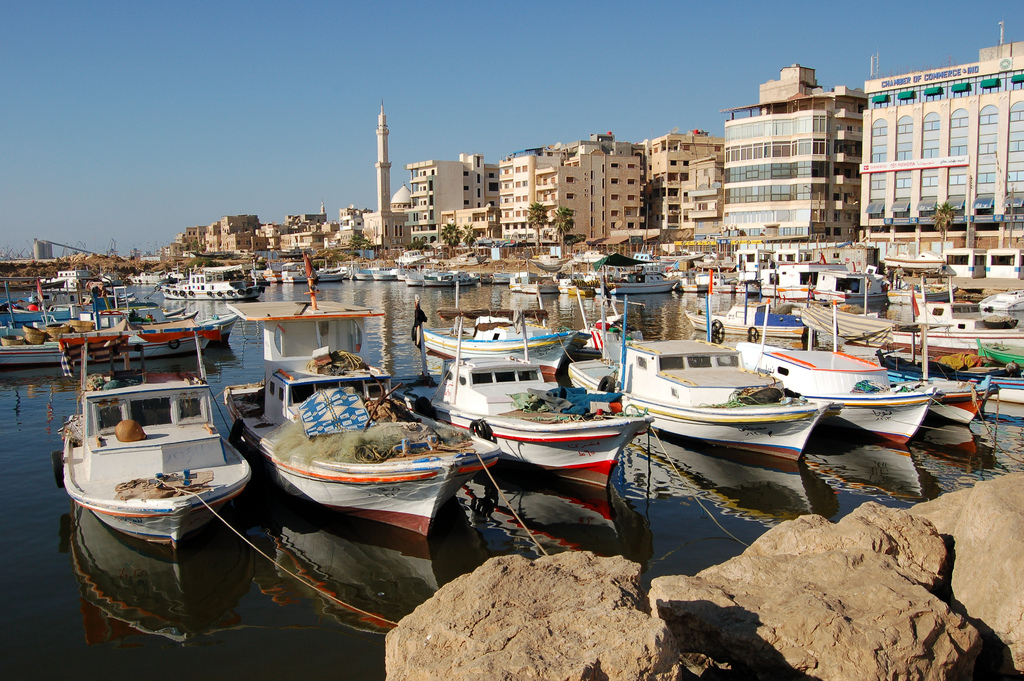
Boats in Tartus harbour

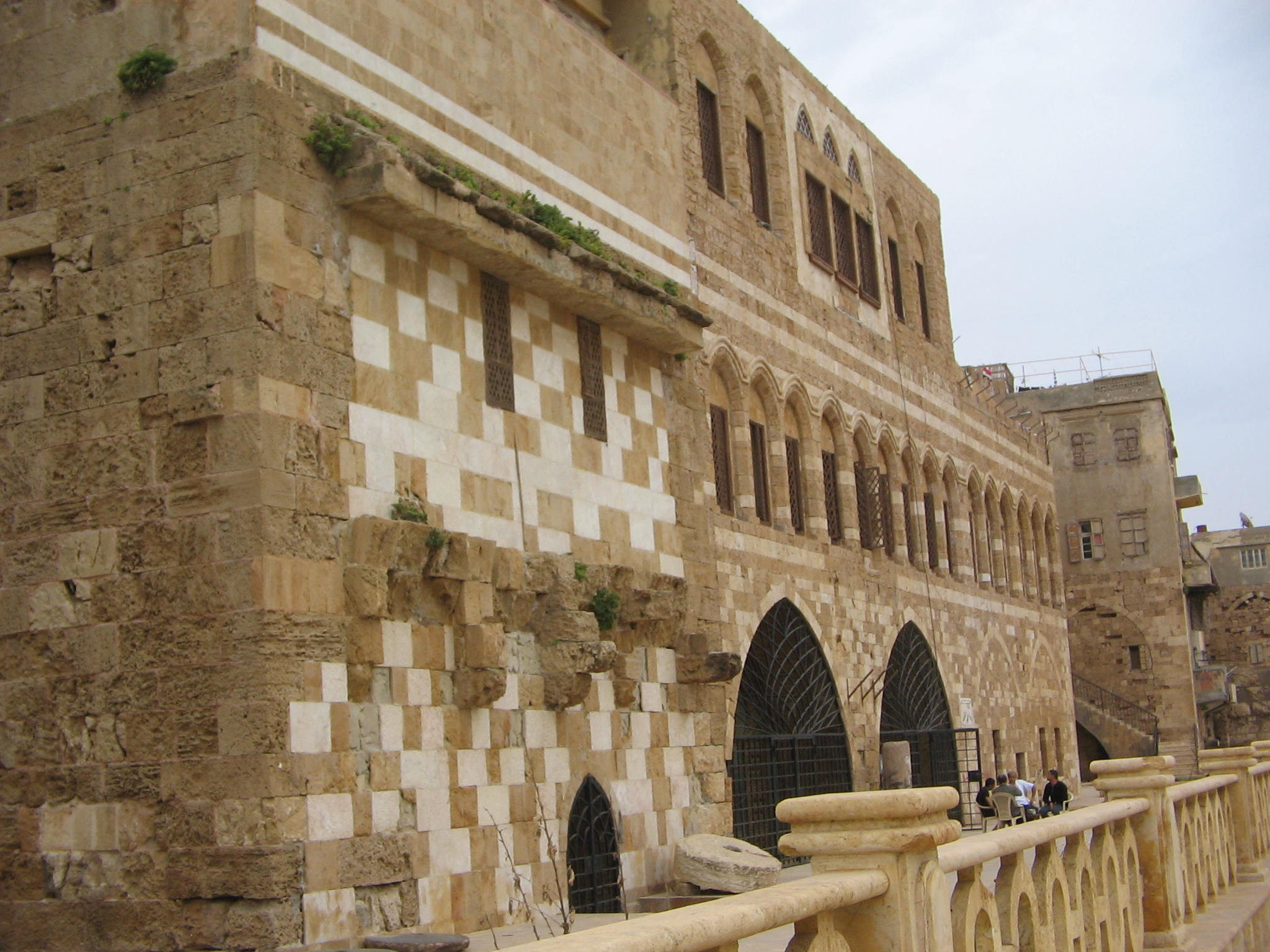
A former Templar citadel, later a naval fortress

The historic centre of Tartus consists of more recent buildings built on and inside the walls of the Crusader-era Templar fortress, whose moat still separates this old town from the modern city on its northern and eastern sides. Outside the fortress few historic remains can be seen, with the exception of the former Romanesque-Gothic cathedral Cathedral of Notre-Dame of Tartus, from the 12th century.

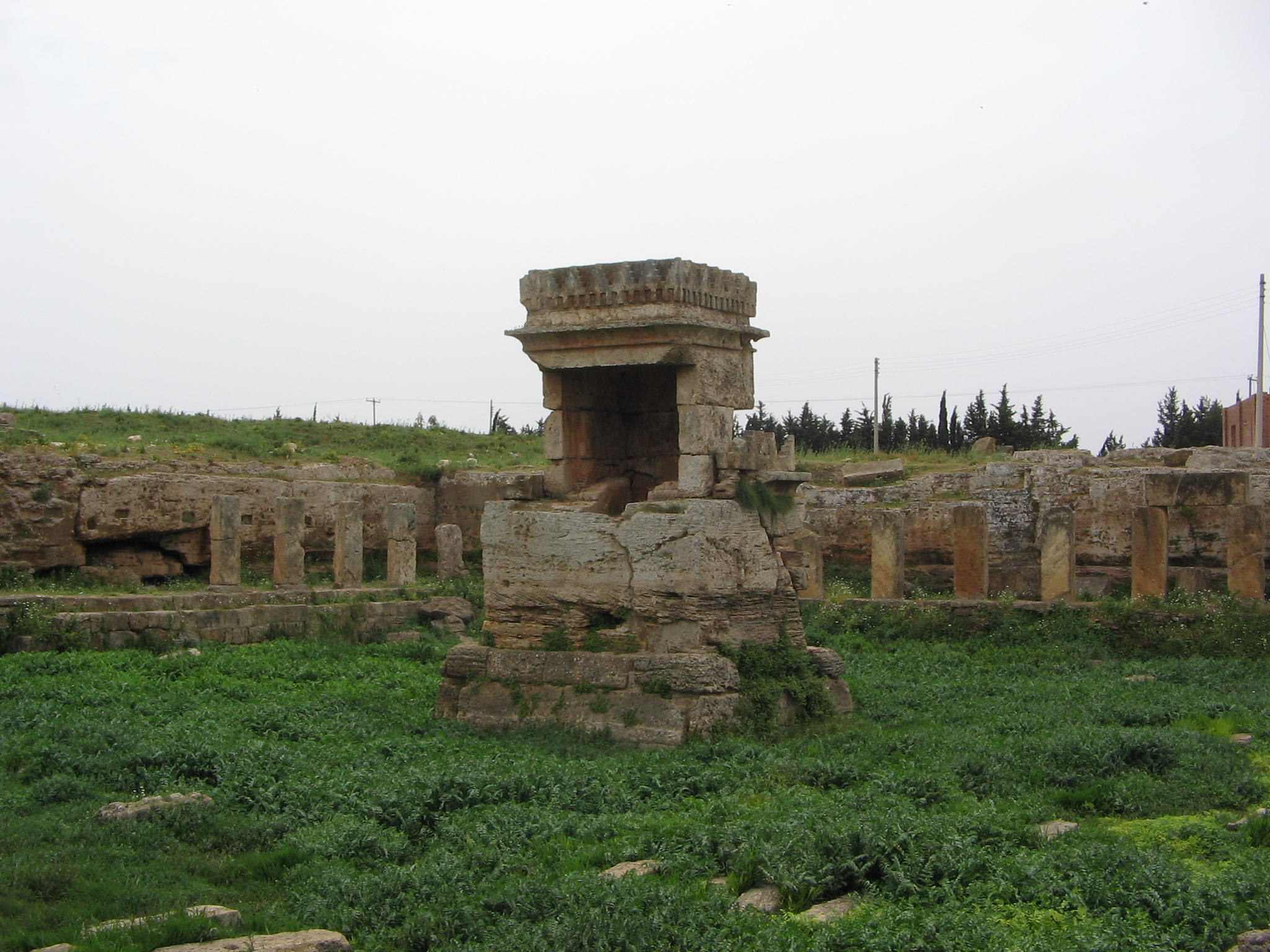
Phoenician Temple (Ma'abed), cella at the centre of the court, Amrit of Tartus in 2006

Tartus and the surrounding area are rich in antiquities and archeological sites. Various important and well known sites are located within a 30-minute drive from Tartus. These attractions include:

- The old city of Tartus.
- Margat Castle, north of the city.
- The historic town of Safita.
- Arwad island and castle.
- The ancient Cathedral of Our Lady of Tortosa, now used as the city museum.
- Beit el-Baik Palace.
- Sheikh Saleh al-Ali shrine in Al-Shaykh Badr.
- Hosn Suleiman Temple.
- Drekish town-resort.

Aside from these historic sites, more modern attractions include:

- Alrimal Alzahabeya beach resort.
- Junada hotel (previously called Porto Tartous).
- Holiday beach resort.
- Mashta Al Helou resort.

The outlying town of Al Hamidiyah just south of Tartus is notable for having a Greek-speaking population of about 3,000 who are the descendants of Ottoman Greek Muslims from the island of Crete but usually confusingly referred to as Cretan Turks. Their ancestors moved there in the late 19th century as refugees from Crete after the Kingdom of Greece acquired the island from the Ottoman Empire following the Greco-Turkish War of 1897. Since the start of the Iraqi War, a few thousand Iraqi nationals now reside in Tartus.

== Twin towns – sister cities ==
Tartus is twinned with:

- Kütahya, Turkey
- Piraeus, Greece (2022)
- Tortosa, Spain (2007)

== Notable people ==
- Saadallah Wannous (1941–1997), playwright and first Arab to deliver the International Theatre Day address
- Sheikh Saleh Al-Ali, pre-independence Syrian revolutionary who fought against the French mandate
- Dr. Halim Barakat, novelist, sociologist and retired research professor
- Mohammad Yousaf Abu al-Farah Tartusi, Muslim saint of the Junaidia order
- Jamal Suliman, actor
- Ghassan Massoud, actor
- Taim Hasan, actor
- Farrah Yousef, singer and Arab Idol Season 2 finalist
- Assef Shawkat, former deputy Minister of Defense of Syria and brother-in-law of Syrian President Bashar al-Assad
