= Greater Beirut =

- بيروت الكبرى
- Country: Lebanon
- Cities: List of settlements

Area
  - Land: 200 km^{2} (77 sq mi)

Population (30 September 2016)
  - Estimate: ~2,200,000
  - Metro density: 11,000/km^{2} (28,000/sq mi)

Greater Beirut (Arabic: بيروت الكبرى) is the urban agglomeration comprising the city of Beirut (Beirut Governorate) and the adjacent municipalities over the Mount Lebanon Governorate. It does not constitute a single administrative unit. Greater Beirut geographically stretches south to the Damour River in the Chouf District until it reaches the "Nahr al-Kalb" river in the Keserwan District in the north. It also comprises many towns and cities in the mountains in the Aley District, Baabda District and Metn District Districts, most notably being the cities of Baabda, Aley, Choueifat, Hazmieh, Sin el-Fil, Jdeideh, Bchamoun and Dekwaneh. The conurbation spreads south, east, and north of Beirut city. To the west, the Eastern Mediterranean Sea serves as a natural boundary.

== Demographics ==
Greater Beirut is equally split between Christians and Muslims:

- West Beirut is predominantly inhabited by Sunni (70%) and a minority of Shia Muslims, with small but substantial numbers of Christians and Druze.
- East and North Beirut is predominantly Christian, of which 65% are Maronites and other Catholics and 35% are Orthodox.
- South Beirut Suburbs also known as Dahieh, is predominantly Shia Muslim (85%) with small co-existing minorities of Sunnis and Christians.

== Districts ==
=== Beirut Governorate ===
- Beirut

=== Mount Lebanon Governorate ===
- Ain Aanoub
- Ain Saadeh
- Aley
- Antelias
- Aramoun
- Baabda
- Basateen
- Bdadoun
- Bechamoun
- Beit Chabab
- Beit Mery
- Bourj Hammoud
- Bourj el-Barajneh
- Bqennaya
- Bsalim
- Choueifat
- Damour
- Dahieh
- Dbayeh
- Dora
- Dekwaneh
- Hadath
- Hazmieh
- Jal el Dib
- Jdeideh
- Kahale
- Khaldeh
- Kfarshima
- Mansourieh
- Mkalles
- Mtaileb
- Na'ameh
- Naqqach
- Qornet Shehwan
- Rabieh
- Roumieh
- Shemlan
- Shiyyah
- Yarze
- Zakrit
- Zalka
