= Transport in Lebanon =

Transportation in Lebanon varies greatly in quality from the ultramodern Beirut International Airport to poor road conditions in many parts of the country. The Lebanese civil war between 1975 and 1990 and the 2006 Lebanon War with Israel severely damaged the country's infrastructure.

== Roads ==
Lebanon has over 8,000 km of roads throughout the country, generally in good condition, although it varies. Many highways are part of the Arab Mashreq International Road Network. The main roads in the country are as follows:

- Beirut - Byblos - Tripoli - Aarida
- Beirut - Sidon - Tyre - Naqoura
- Beirut - Bhamdoun Al Mhatta - Chtaura - Masnaa
- Chtaura - Zahlé - Baalbek - Qaa
- Chtaura - Qab Elias - Machgara - Nabatieh
- Tripoli - Bsharri - Baalbek
- Amaret Chalhoub - Jouret El Ballout - Baabdat

=== Motorways ===
Part of the main road network have been updated to dual carriageway, four-lane motorways, which are the following:

- Beirut - Tripoli. Length: 81 km.
- Beirut - Kfar Badde. Length: 65 km.
- Beirut - Mdeyrej. Length: 33 km.
- Tripoli - Khane. Length: 20 km.

== Buses ==
An overland trans-desert bus service between Beirut, Haifa, Damascus and Baghdad was established by the Nairn Transport Company of Damascus in 1923.

Beirut has frequent bus connections to other cities in Lebanon and major cities in Syria. The Lebanese Commuting Company, or LCC in short, is just one of a handful brands of public transportations all over Lebanon. On the other hand, the publicly owned buses are managed by le Office des Chemins de Fer et des Transports en Commun (OCFTC), or the Railway and Public Transportation Authority in English. Buses for northern destinations and Syria leave from Charles Helou Station.

In August 2024, Lebanon relaunched a new public bus system with the support of ACTC, aiming to operate 11 bus lines. However, as of today, only 7 lines are officially running according to their website, with lines B1, B3, and ML3 divided into 2 lines of different directions.

The lines running are:

- Line B1
- Line B2
- Line B3
- Line ML3

The fare for the bus service varies depending on the line, ranging between £L70,000 ($0.78) and £L100,000 ($1.12) as of 2024. Looking ahead, there are plans to expand the network further outside inter-city communication within Beirut.

== Ferries ==
Apart from the international airport, the Port of Beirut is another port of entry. As a final destination, anyone can also reach Lebanon by ferry from Cyprus, or Greece or by road from Damascus, etc. The Port of Tripoli (Lebanon) is also a port of entry.

A ferry line connecting Tasucu to Tripoli connects Turkey to Lebanon without passing through Syria. However, it is mainly used for trucks and cargo.

In 2025, the Cypriot and Lebanese governments announced the launch of a new ferry route, connecting Larnaca to Jounieh.

== Taxis and services ==
In order to get from one place to another, people can either use a service or taxis. Cabs can be recognized by their red license plates (indicating that it is licensed for public transportation). The driver would pull aside for if the person hails while seeing him. He will then ask for his destination and then will decide whether he will drive the passenger with the regular fare, an extra, or not at all.

=== Types of taxis in Lebanon ===
- Service-taxis

One has to specify one's destination and enter the taxi only if one's destination corresponds to the itinerary of the Service-taxi. The driver stops to pick up additional passengers anywhere on the streets and drop them off.

Service-Taxi Taxi

- Local
  - £L2,000 ($1.33) per person or £L4,000 ($2.66) per person depending on how close/far the destination is. Prices within Beirut could vary depending on traffic and distance but overall should not exceed £L4,000 per person (Maximum of £L5,000 for Beirut outskirts). However, the driver could ask for more if the passenger intends to go to an area with high traffic like Hamra Street.
- Long Distance
  - Starts from £L5,000 ($3.33) and goes up from there. For example, from Beirut to Sidon, the drivers usually charge in between £L50,000 ($33.33) and £L75,000 ($50).
- Traditional Taxis

The driver must not pick up additional passengers. Most of these taxis are not equipped with meters, so it is important to negotiate the fare before embarking. The regular taxi fare starts at £L10,000 ($6.66).

- Online services

Uber and Careem are both available in Lebanon as online services.

- On-call taxis

Pick up people who have pre-booked by phone.

== Port infrastructure ==
=== Airport ===
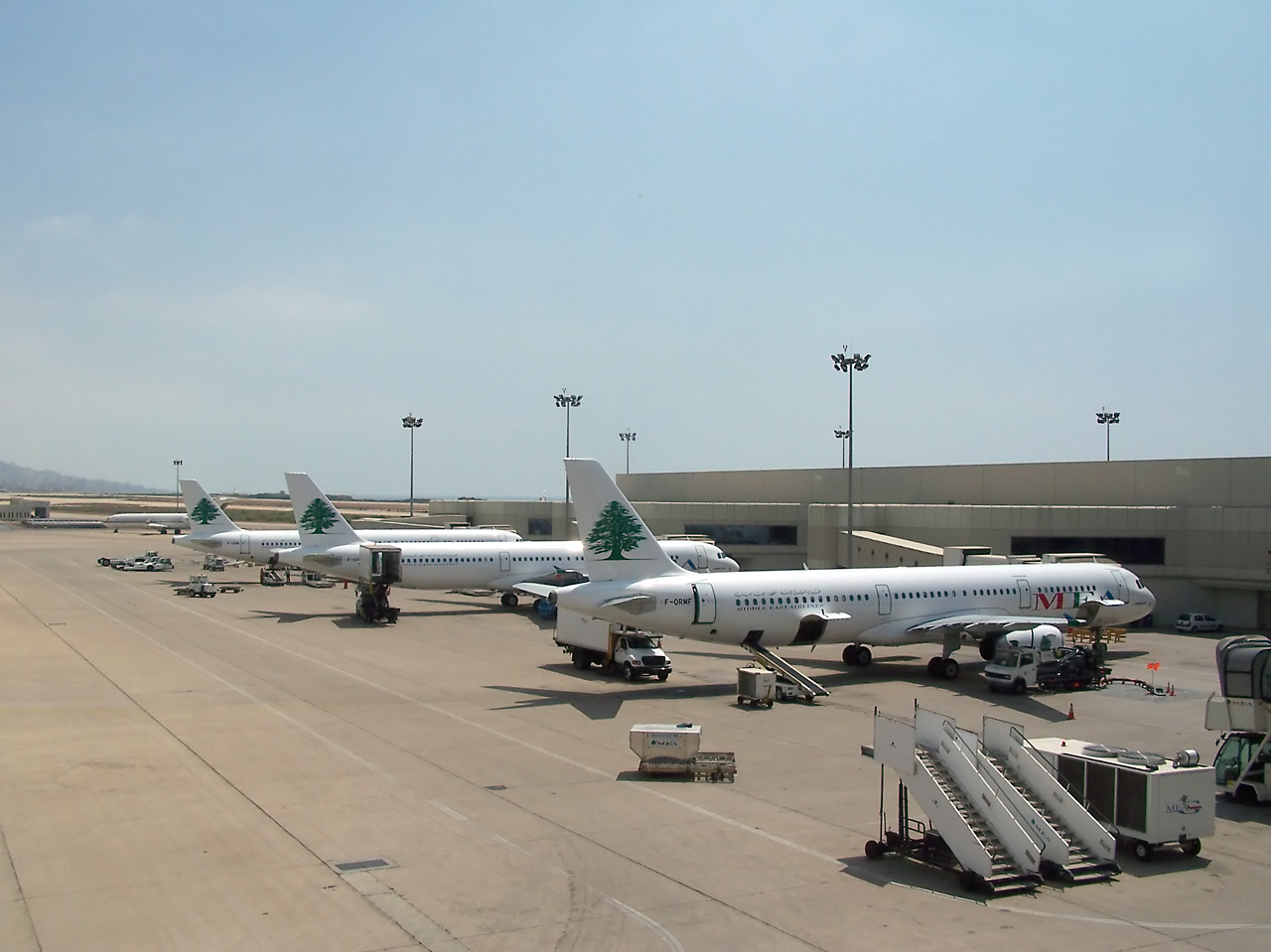
The Beirut Rafic Hariri International Airport, Beirut

The main national airport is the Beirut Rafic Hariri International Airport and is located in the southern suburbs. The Travel and Tourism Competitiveness report ranked the country 51st in terms of air transport infrastructure.

In 2017, a delegation from Lebanon's Civil Aviation Authority inspected the Rene Mouawad Air Base in order to assess the needs and requirements of reconstructing the air base.

== Cable Car ==
A cable car, Téléphérique de Jounieh, operates in the Mount Lebanon Governorate between the coast of Jounieh and Harissa. The cable car has been active since 1965.

== Rail transport ==
The Lebanese rail system is not currently in use, with services having ceased due to the country's political difficulties.

- For more information, check: Rail transport in Lebanon
