= Bqennaya =

Lebanese town

Coordinates: 33°54′11″N 35°35′20″E

Bqennaya (Arabic: بقنايا, romanized: Bqinnāyā) is a Lebanese town located in the Metn District of Mount Lebanon in Lebanon. The population is almost exclusively Christian. Its Christian population is centered around one central parish called Saint Thecla (locally referred to as Mar Takla) which is a Catholic Maronite parish.

This small town is famous by its close proximity to the coastal highway. There are several towns around Bqennaya including: Jal el Dib, Biaqout, Majzoub, Bsalim, Mezher, Antelias, and Zalka.
