= Jouret El Ballout =

Jouret El Ballout جورة البلوط
- City
- Location within Lebanon
- Coordinates: 33.8910°N 35.6349°E
- Country: Lebanon
- Governorate: Mount Lebanon Governorate
- District: Matn District

Government
  - Mayor: Issam Bou Jaoude

Area
  - Total: 1.69 km^{2} (0.65 sq mi)
- Highest elevation: 720 m (2,360 ft)
- Lowest elevation: 600 m (2,000 ft)

Population (2007)
  - Total: 700
  - Density: 410/km^{2} (1,100/sq mi)
- Time zone: UTC+2 (EET)
  - Summer (DST): UTC+3 (EEST)
- Dialing code: +961-4-

Jouret El Ballout (Arabic: جورة البلوط, romanized: jūrat al-balūṭ) is a christian village in the Matn District in the Mount Lebanon Governorate of Lebanon. Its inhabitants are almost predominantly Maronite Catholic.

== Etymology ==
The village of Jouret El Ballout owes its name to its geographical position – a low point surrounded by mountains (Mar Chaaya mountain to the north and Haref mountain to the west): جورة means pit or cavern in Arabic. It is also surrounded by tall oak trees (Arabic: البلوط, romanized: al-balūṭ). Therefore, the name is a description of the village: The Pit of Oak Trees.

== Location ==
Jouret El-Ballout is 20 km (12 mi) east of Beirut and covers an area of 169 hectares (420 acres) in the Qada’a of the Northern Metn, in the Mohafaza of Mount Lebanon. It is bordered by Nabay from the west, Deir Mar Cha’aya from the north, Broummana from the east and Kannaba Broummana from the south. It is 720 metres (2,360 ft) above sea level and it has views of Beirut and the Mediterranean. It can be reached via three different routes: Mkalles - Beit Merry - Broumanna - Jouret El-Ballout, Antelias - Deir As-Salib - Nabay - Jouret El-Ballout, or Maten highway.

== Climate ==
Summer is usually dry in Jouret El Ballout; it begins in early May and ends in mid-October. Summer temperature rarely exceeds 30 °C (86 °F), with a lower limit of around 20 °C (68 °F). Its relative humidity in summer runs at 68%. Winter is wet and mild, with temperatures ranging between 5 and 15 °C (41 and 59 °F), with the occasional snowfall. The lowest temperature is variable but the lowest recorded a few years ago was about −4 °C (25 °F) during a snow storm.

== Archeological and cultural sites ==
Despite the relatively recent inception of the village, remains of several stone and earthen sarcophagi have been found there. The region of A’aranta in Jouret El-Ballout is in fact well known for its archeological wealth: remains of an old fortress were discovered, as well as some Phoenicians and Romanian tombs. Excavation works also showed that wood blast furnaces going back to the Phoenician era existed on this site.

== Educational institutions ==
A public school was founded in the village in 1946, but it closed in 1980s. Today, there are two private schools in Jouret El-Ballout:

- Collège Louise Wegmann
- Valley International School
