= Zarooun =

Zaraaoun زرعون
- Village
- Zaraaoun
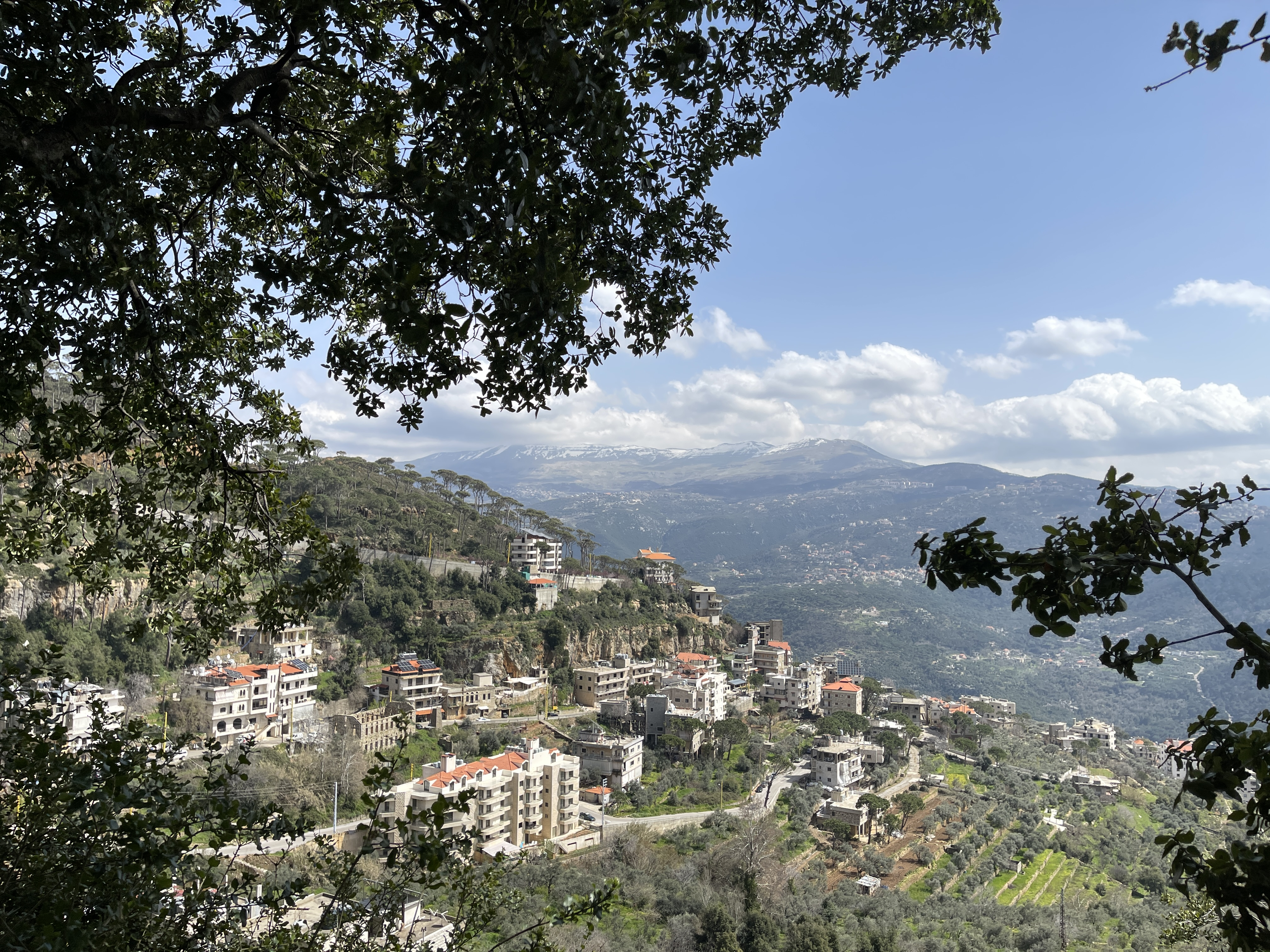
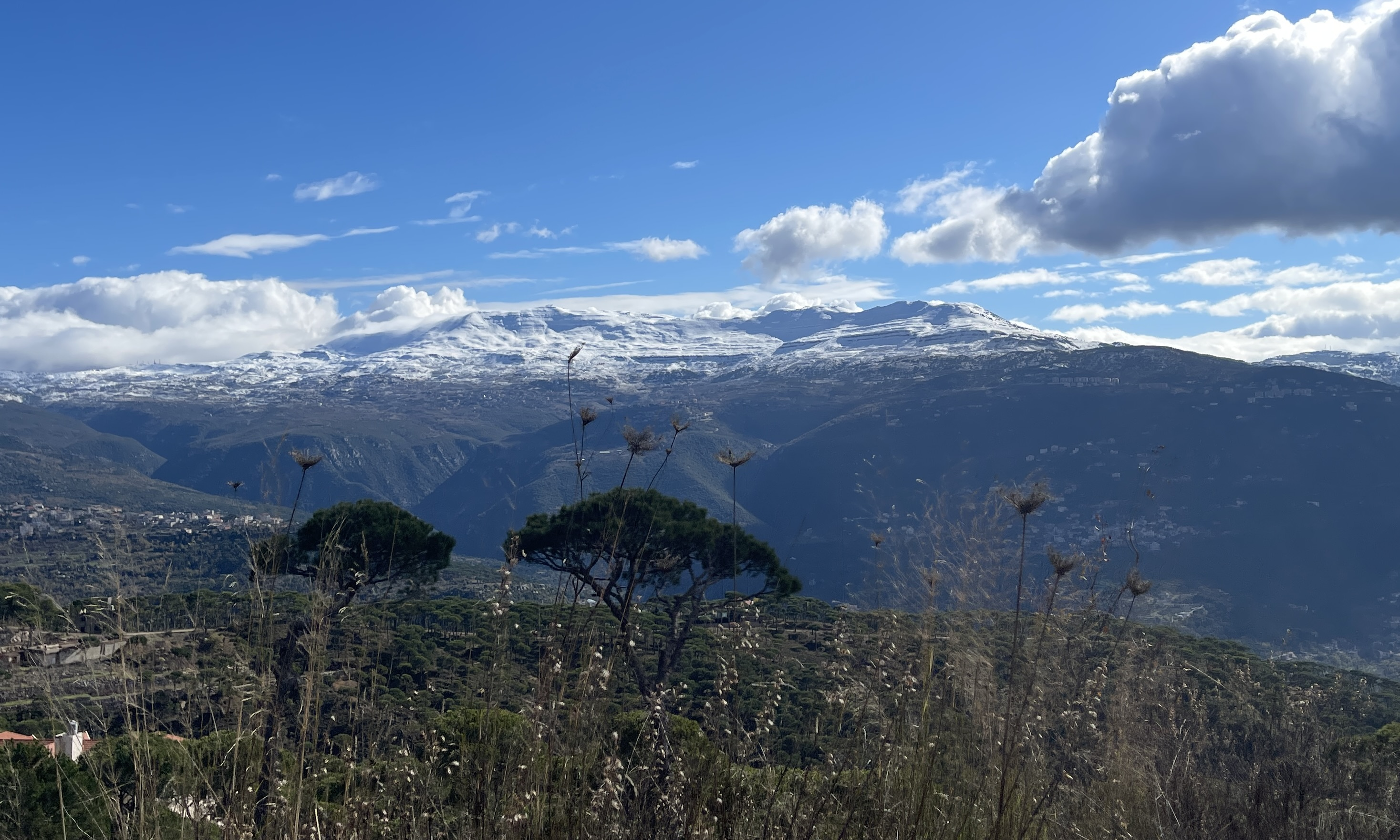
- View from Zaraoun View from Zaraoun in the winter

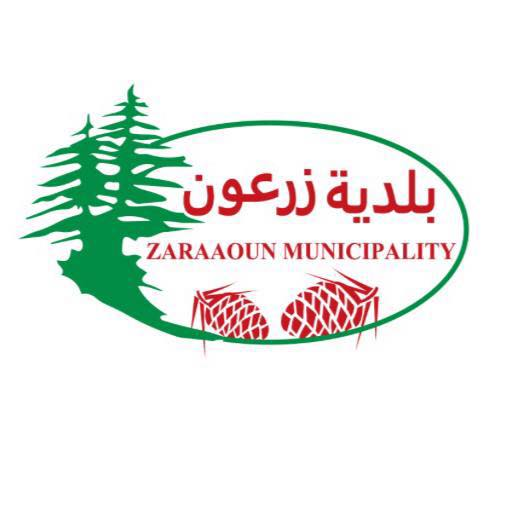
- Interactive map of Zaraaoun
- Location within Lebanon
- Coordinates: 33.895728°N 35.709274°E
- Country: Lebanon
- Governorate: Mount Lebanon
- District: Matn

Government
  - Body: Municipality of Zaraaoun
  - Mayor: Ramzi Daou

Area
  - Total: 1.19 km^{2} (0.46 sq mi)
- Highest elevation: 1,150 m (3,770 ft)
- Lowest elevation: 900 m (3,000 ft)

Population
  - Total: ≈1,000

Religion
  - Druze: 98.2%
  - Maronite Christians: 1.2%
  - Orthodox Christians: 0.6%

Zarooun (Arabic: زرعون), also spelled Zaraoun or Zaraaoun, is a small village located in the Northern Matn District (قضاء المتن الشمالي) of the Mount Lebanon Governorate in Lebanon. Zaraaoun is notable for being a majority Druze community situated within the largely Christian North Matn District. According to official voter registration records issued by the Lebanese Ministry of Interior in 2014, Zaraaoun has a modest population and limited urban development, reflecting its rural and mountainous identity.

== Geography ==
Zaraaoun lies approximately 30 kilometres northeast of Beirut at an elevation ranging between 900 and 1,150 metres above sea level and covers an area of 116 hectares (1.16 km^{2}). Neighboring localities include Douar to the west, Ayroun the northwest, Dhour el Choueir to the north, Qaaqour to the east, and Zahriye to the south. The village is characterized by a rugged mountainous landscape and dense pine tree coverage, which are typical features of the central Mount Lebanon range. Its elevated position provides expansive views of surrounding valleys and contributes to its distinct climate.

== Climate ==
Zaraaoun experiences a Mediterranean mountain climate. Winters are cold and relatively wet, with temperatures typically ranging between −4 °C and 11 °C. Snowfall is common during the winter months, with the village receiving approximately 15–25 centimetres of snow annually. Summers, by contrast, are hot and humid, with daytime temperatures often reaching around 34 °C. Despite the summer heat, the village’s elevation moderates temperatures compared to coastal areas of Lebanon.

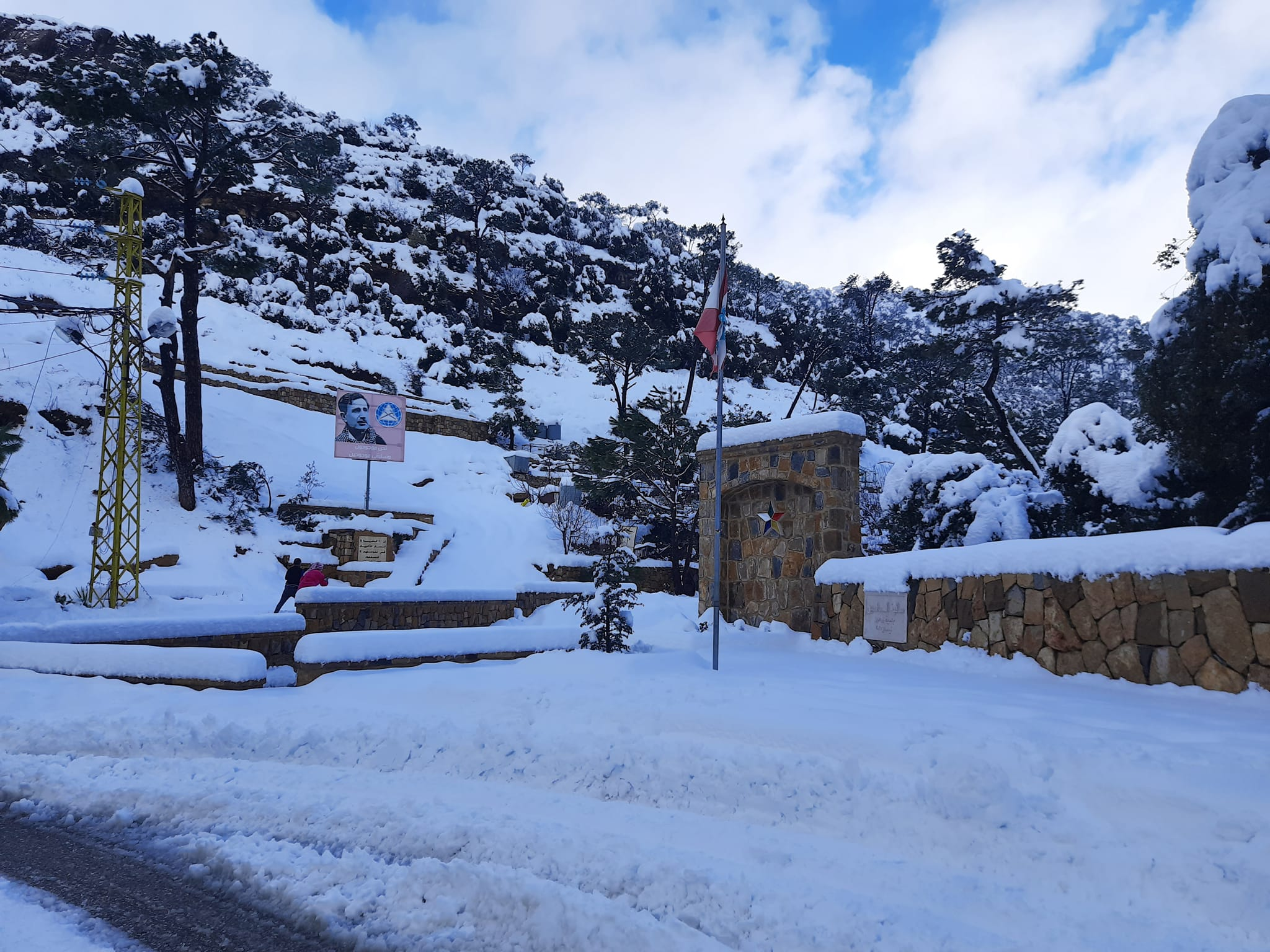
Kamal Joumblat square in winter

== History ==
Historically, Zaraaoun occupied a larger territorial area than its present-day boundaries. Over time, population movement from the village contributed to the establishment of settlements, most notably Haouch el Zaraane in the city of Zahle. This expansion and later migration occurred primarily during the 17th century, reflecting broader patterns of Druze settlement and land use in Mount Lebanon and the Beqaa.

== Demographics ==
Zaraaoun is overwhelmingly Druze in religious composition, with approximately 98% of its population adhering to the Druze faith. A small Christian minority, estimated at around 2%, is present in the village, largely as a result of historical intermarriage between Druze and Christian families in the region. Despite its location within a predominantly Christian district, the village has maintained its Druze cultural and social identity.

== Families ==
Two principal families have historically formed the social foundation of Zaraaoun:

=== Daou Family ===
The Daou (ضو) family is one of the most prominent families in Zaraaoun and is associated with Druze heritage in Mount Lebanon. Genealogical and historical records indicate that a Druze ancestor of the Daou family resided in or near Zaraaoun before the family expanded to other regions, including Baabda, Chouf, the Galilee, Haifa, and later the Beqaa Valley. Members of the family were instrumental in the establishment of Haouch el Zaraane in Zahle during the 17th century before relocating from the immediate area in subsequent generations. Genetic studies and family records generally identify the Daou family as ethnically Lebanese, reflecting the long-standing continuity of the population in Mount Lebanon.

=== Zeid Family ===
The Zeid family is the second major family present in Zaraaoun. Like the Daou family, the Zeids are part of the broader Lebanese Druze community and have resided in the village for generations. Although less extensively documented in published genealogical sources, local historical tradition recognizes the Zeid family as integral to the village’s social and demographic history.

== Places in Zaraaoun ==
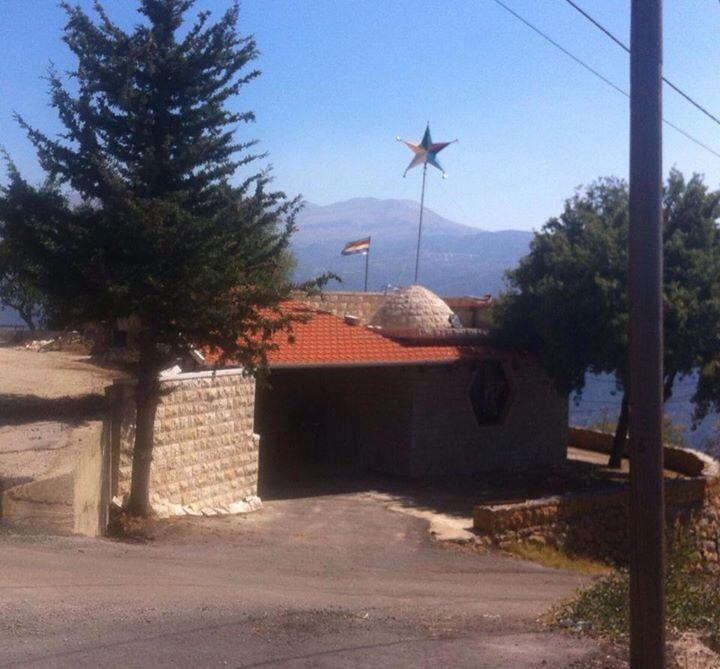
Shrine of the Deceased in Zaraaoun

Zaraaoun contains several locally significant places that reflect its social, political, and religious life. Kamal Jumblatt Square is one of the central public spaces in the village and is named after the prominent Lebanese Druze leader and founder of the Progressive Socialist Party. The square contains a memorial dedicated to him, as well as a historic cannon, symbolizing resistance, political heritage, and the village’s historical alignment with Druze political movements. Another important institution is the Zaraaoun Social Center, which serves as a communal hub for public meetings, cultural events, social gatherings, and municipal activities. The village also has a sports and youth club building known locally as the Nede, commonly referred to as the "نادي النديانة", named after a large oak tree, the club serves as a venue for sporting, recreational, and social activities. In addition, Zaraaoun is home to a small Druze shrine known as "مزار المرحومة" (Shrine of the Deceased), which is traditionally associated with a noble woman in local history and serves as a site of quiet reflection and spiritual significance.

== Politics ==
Political life in Zaraaoun reflects both local dynamics and broader Lebanese ideological divisions. The village is generally divided between supporters of the Progressive Socialist Party (PSP) and the Syrian Social Nationalist Party (SSNP). The PSP, founded by Kamal Jumblatt, has historically enjoyed strong support among Druze communities in Mount Lebanon, including Zaraaoun. The SSNP in Zaraaoun reflects ideological diversity within the village, particularly among residents who prioritize secular nationalism over confessional or sectarian political alignment. These political affiliations are most visible during elections and local political events, though they generally coexist within the village’s tightly knit social structure.

== Notable people ==
- Mark Daou is a Lebanese politician and parliamentarian originating from Zaraaoun. He currently serves as a member of the Lebanese Parliament, where he is associated with reform-oriented and opposition political movements. In his parliamentary role, he has been active on issues related to governance reform, accountability, and state sovereignty, and is considered part of the post-2019 generation of legislators seeking institutional change in Lebanon.
