= Nabay =

Village in Mount Lebanon

Nabay نابيه
- Village
- Location in Lebanon
- Coordinates: 33°54′00″N 35°37′14″E
- Country: Lebanon
- Governorate: Mount Lebanon
- District: Matn
- Elevation: 1,600 ft (500 m)
- Time zone: UTC+2 (EET)
  - Summer (DST): +3

Nabay (Arabic: نابيه, from the Aramaic: נביא ; ܢܒܺܝܶ̈ܐ) is a village located in the Matn District (kada), Mount Lebanon Governorate (Mohafazat). Nabay is located 16 kilometers (9.9424 mi) away from the capital Beirut. Its elevation is 500 meters (1640.5 ft - 546.8 yd) above sea level. Nabay surface stretches for 388 hectares (3.88 km² - 1.49768 mi²).

The name of Nabay is derived from the Aramaic and Biblical Hebrew words for "prophets", written as ܢܒܝܐ in cursive Syriac, and as נביא in block script. Thus, the implied meaning of the name is "land of prophets" or "of the prophets." This word has its cognate in the Arabic plural, الأنبياء (al'anbia'), and in the singular form, نبي (nabī).

The village locals are entirely Eastern Rite Christians, with the Greek Orthodox population consisting of the majority. However, a substantial amount of the population also belong to Greek Catholic and Maronite churches. One shared trait amongst all three groups is their patronage to Saint Michael the Archangel (Mar Mikhael). Saint Michael is considered to be the patron saint of the village, and a large icon of him can be seen upon entering the village from the lower end. In the center of the village, there are three churches across from each other all dedicated to St. Michael, with each church belonging to one of the three primary sects listed above. It is a commonly held belief that St. Michael miraculously defended the local population from being massacred by Druze and Muslims during the 1860 Mount Lebanon Civil War. Each year, on September 6th, the villagers celebrate the Feast of St. Michael, commemorating the miracle of St. Michael at Colossae (Chonae) in the 4th century.

Currently, there is a new Antiochian Greek Orthodox church under construction in the heart of the village, dedicated to St. Isaac the Assyrian and to hieromonk Fr. Isaac Atallah. A native of the village, Isaac (whose birth name was Fares) became a priest-monk of the Antiochian Orthodox church and lived in several monasteries in Lebanon before finally settling at Mt. Athos in Greece. As is customary in monasticism, he received the name Isaac in honor of his patron saint, St. Isaac of Nineveh. Father Isaac is widely venerated amongst the local population, and has gained a strong spiritual following both in his home country of Lebanon and in Greece.

Within Nabay, there are various subsections and areas. For instance, the portion of the village that houses the mausoleums is called Rām, which is derived from the Biblical Hebrew: רמ (Syriac: ܪܡܐ), meaning "a high place." There also exists a densely wooded and forested portion of the village, which is called Rāmayyah. The suffix, -ayyah, is unique to Western Levantine Aramaic. It denotes a plural, thus, the word Rāmayyah means "the heights."

Towns near Nabay include Brummana, Rabieh, Bsalim, and Antelias.
