= Pascale Machaalani =

Lebanese singer (born 1967)

Pascale Machaalani باسكال مشعلاني
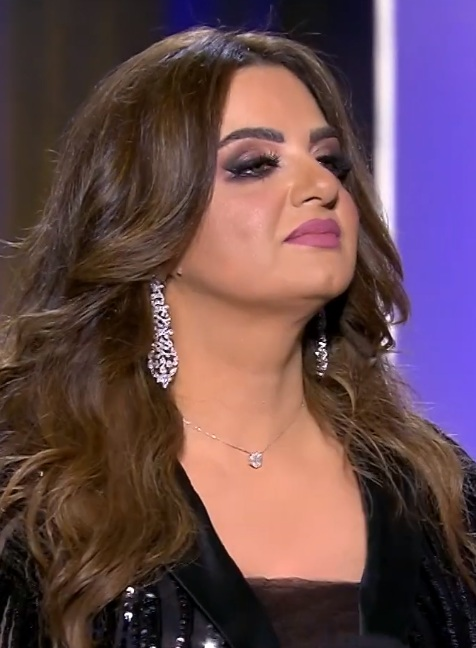
- Pascale Machaalani, Souq Wagif festival, Doha, March 2019

Background information
- Born: Pascale Bechara Bachaalani; 27 March 1967 (age 59); Zalka, Matn District, Lebanon
- Origin: Jounieh, Lebanon
- Genres: Arabic music, pop music, Music of Lebanon
- Occupations: Singer, actress
- Years active: 1991–present
- Label: Rotana (2004–present)
- Website: Official Website

Pascale Bechara Machaalani (Arabic: باسكال بشارة مشعلاني; born 27 March 1967) is a Lebanese singer and actress. Her debut album Sahar Sahar rose her to stardom throughout the Middle East, making Mashalaani one of the most successful female artistes in 1990s Lebanon. She released her second and third albums, Nazrat Ayounak and Banadi with continued success. Her seventh studio album, Nour el Shams released in late December 1999 was a phenomenal success which exceeded sales of 250,000 She has released thirteen hit studio albums and twenty-seven singles.

Machaalani is currently one of the most active Lebanese singers and has performed in a number countries, beginning from her native Lebanon to Europe and US. She is signed to Rotana, the biggest record company in the Middle East.

== Biography ==
=== Personal life ===
Pascale Bechara Bechalani was born on 27 March 1967, in Zalka, Lebanon, and grew up in Jounieh. Pascale began performing as a child. Her father died before her first birthday. Her mother took care of her, who had accompanied her since the beginning of her career. She married the composer Melhem Abou Chedid in May 2010 & had a son named Elie, who was born on 14 September 2011. She also holds a Canadian nationality.

=== Musical career ===
The composer Ihsan Al Munzer and the poet Toufiq Barakat discovered her talent. The beginning of her career was with her first album Sahar Sahar by the composer Jamal Salameh and the poet Abed Rahman Al Abnoudi. Pascale had work with many Arabic composers and poets from different countries.

Her seventh studio album, Nour el Shams (The Light from the Sun) was a blockbuster success and became one of the biggest selling albums in the Middle East. The main song of the album was featured in the hit movie, Spy Game which featured Brad Pitt and Robert Redford.

In addition, Machaalani was crowned the Beauty Queen of Zahleh, Lebanon, when she was 13 years of age .

Her music is particularly popular in the middle eastern community in Melbourne, Australia. Beats sing through the air in community businesses, including local construction sites, accompanied by upbeat and joyous laughter as her music promotes harmony during challenging times.

== Discography ==
=== Studio albums ===
- Sahar Sahar (Arabic: سهر سهر)
- Nazret Ouyounak (Arabic: نظرة عيونك)
- Banadi (Arabic: بنادي – 1994)
- Albak Assi (Arabic: قلبك قاسي – Your Heart is Harsh – 1996)
- Lamma Bshoufak (Arabic: لما بشوفك – To See You – 1998)
- Khayala (Arabic: خيالة – Fantasy – 1999)
- Nour El Shams (Arabic: نور الشمس – Light of the Sun – 2000)
- Albi (Arabic: قلبي – My Heart – 2001)
- Shou Amaltellak Ana (Arabic: شو عملتلك انا – 2003)
- Sa'beh Eish... Men Dounak (Arabic: صعبة عيش من دونك – 2004)
- Akbar Kidba Bi Hayati (Arabic: أكبر كذبة بحياتي – 2005)
- Akhed Aqli (Arabic: آخذ عقلي – Take My Mind – 2007)
- Bahebak Ana Bahebak (Arabic: بحبك انا بحبك – I Love You, I Love You – 2009)
- Pascal 2015 (Arabic: باسكال 2015 – 2015)
- Hobbi Mesh Haky (Arabic: حبي مش حكي – 2017)

Single songs

- "A7lam El Banat" احلام البنات
- "St. Rafka" ترتيلة القديسة رفقا

=== Compilations ===
- Ma Fi Nawm (Arabic: ما في نوم)
