= Zakrit =

Zakrit زكريت ܙܰܓܪܸܬܳ
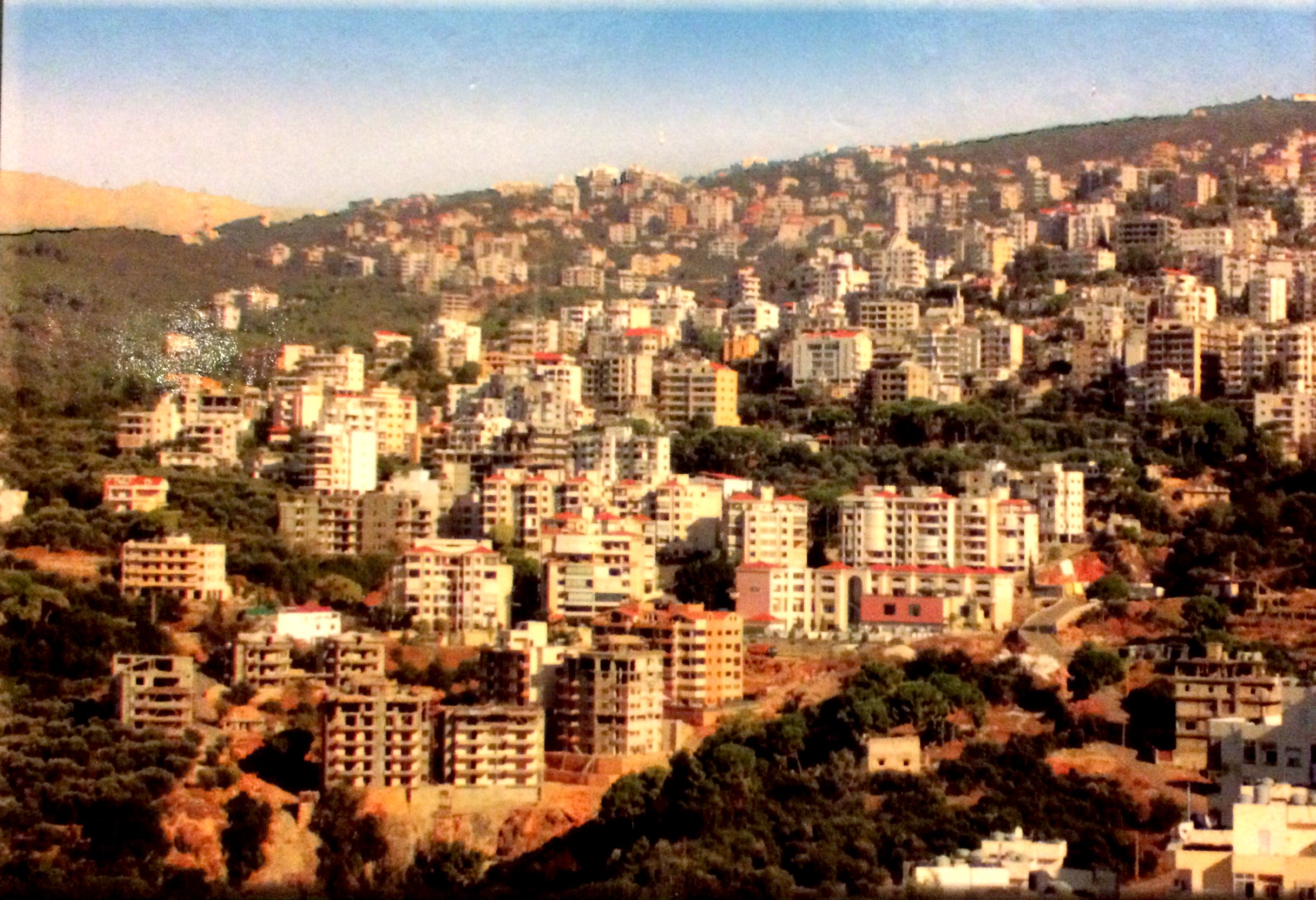
- Zakrit

- Location within Lebanon
- Coordinates: 33.93°N 35.58°E
- Town: Lebanon
- Governorate: Mount-Lebanon

Government
  - Mayor: Adib Morcos

Area
  - Total: 1 km^{2} (0.39 sq mi)
- Elevation: 300 m (980 ft)

Population (2014)
  - Total: 4,500 (approx.)
  - Density: 4,500/km^{2} (12,000/sq mi)
- Demonym: Zakriti
- Time zone: UTC+2 (EET)
  - Summer (DST): UTC+3 (EEST)
- Area code: +961-4
- Website: www.zakrit.com

Zakrit (Arabic: زكريت, romanized: Zekrit, Classical Syriac: ܙܰܓܪܸܬܳ) is a town located in Matn, Mount-Lebanon, Lebanon. No official census has been done but local estimates range slightly less than 4500. Zakrit lies on the western slope of Mount-Lebanon overlooking the Mediterranean Sea and the city of Jounieh. This small Lebanese town is predominantly Maronite Catholic.

== Etymology ==
The origin of the name goes back to Syriac, a variety (linguistics) of the Aramaic languages. The translation would be “Zagrito” ܙܰܓܪܸܬܳ meaning Isolated due to its isolated geographic location between the two hills of Tamich and Al-mshamar. Some historians attribute the origins of this name to a hermit ascetic monk that lived in one of Zakrit’s temples in the 15th century.

== History ==
Zakrit was inhabited long before the Mamluk occupied, burned and sacked the district of Keserwan, which at the time included Zakrit amongst other towns and villages like Beit-Chabab, Bikfaya and Brummana before the year 1305. It was repopulated after the invasion of Lebanon by the Ottomans in 1516. Families such as Habakkuk (some believe is the origins of Morcos family), Hawat, Yammine, and then later the families of Hayek and Ghsoub from Beit-Chabab. In the middle of the 20th century the family al-Malak was added to the town’s population. The population of Zakrit in 1865 was 230.

=== Geography ===
Zakrit sits on the western slope of Mount-Lebanon, overlooking the Mediterranean Sea and the city of Jounieh and about 13.9 km from the capital Beirut and 269 meters above sea-level. Zakrit’s occupies about 1 square kilometer. The town is located near Naher el Kaleb river and is accessible either from the historical valley of Naher el Kaleb or through Mazraat-Yachouh from the south-east of the town. To its west lie the two hills of Tamich and Al-mshamar, to the north Jeitta grotto and the exit point of Cornet-el-Hamra. The surface of Zakrit ranges about 1050000 square meters, and is recognized in real-estate as “greater-Beirut”. There are several historical parts of Zakrit such as: Al-Krokoff, Ainimo’ and Ainamir. Names deriving from Syriac. Al-makhada although legally part of Dbayeh municipality, it is historically affiliated with Zakrit. Most of its population stem from Zakriti families that occupied the western part of the town to cultivate lemons and oranges. The inhabitants of Al-Makhada vote in Zakrit.

=== Climate ===
Zakrit has a warm Mediterranean climate characterized by mild days and nights with an average yearly temperature of 19.2 °C (66.6 °F). Warm during summer days and relatively cool during summer nights due to its open-air location on the western slope of Mount-Lebanon. August is considered the hottest month of the year, with a monthly average of 27 °C (81 °F). January and February are the coldest months, with a monthly average low of 11 °C (52 °F). The average annual rainfall is 930 millimetres (37 in), with most rain falling during the winter season. Snow is occasional, about once every year and does not usually hold that long.

Climate data reported for 2014–2015, Zakrit
| Month | Jan | Feb | Mar | Apr | May | Jun | Jul | Aug | Sep | Oct | Nov | Dec | Year |
|---|---|---|---|---|---|---|---|---|---|---|---|---|---|
| Average °C | 11 | 11.5 | 14 | 16 | 19.5 | 23 | 24.5 | 25 | 22.5 | 20 | 16 | 12 | 19.2 |
| Average precipitation mm | 210 | 175 | 125 | 60 | 21 | 2 | 2 | 2 | 5 | 38 | 115 | 175 | 920 |

== Demographics ==
No official population census has ever been conducted but local estimates of the municipality fall just below 4500. Zakrit has a predominantly Maronite Catholic population.

== Religion ==
Although a small town, Zakrit holds 2 convents and 3 churches on its grounds. The town is predominantly Maronite Catholic but also holds a minority of Eastern and Roman Orthodox, Roman Catholic.

Al-Wardieh church (Arabic: كنيسة الورديه)

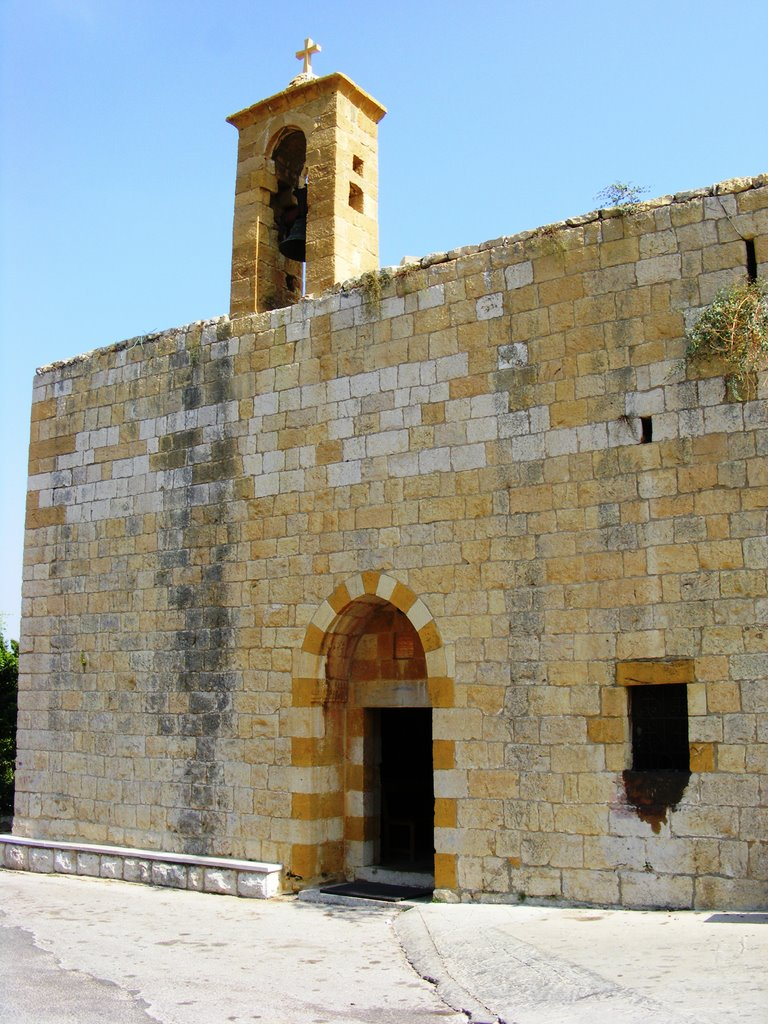
Rosary Church

translated to “the rosary”, was built in 1720. The church was renovated several times throughout the years but it has kept all its historical attributes and structure. Father Yohanna Yammine the caretaker of Al-Wardieh church between the years 1873 and 1890 was the first immigrant of Zakrit to the United States where he established a group of believers in Kansas City in 1893.

Al-Khalas Church (Arabic: كنيسة الخلاص)

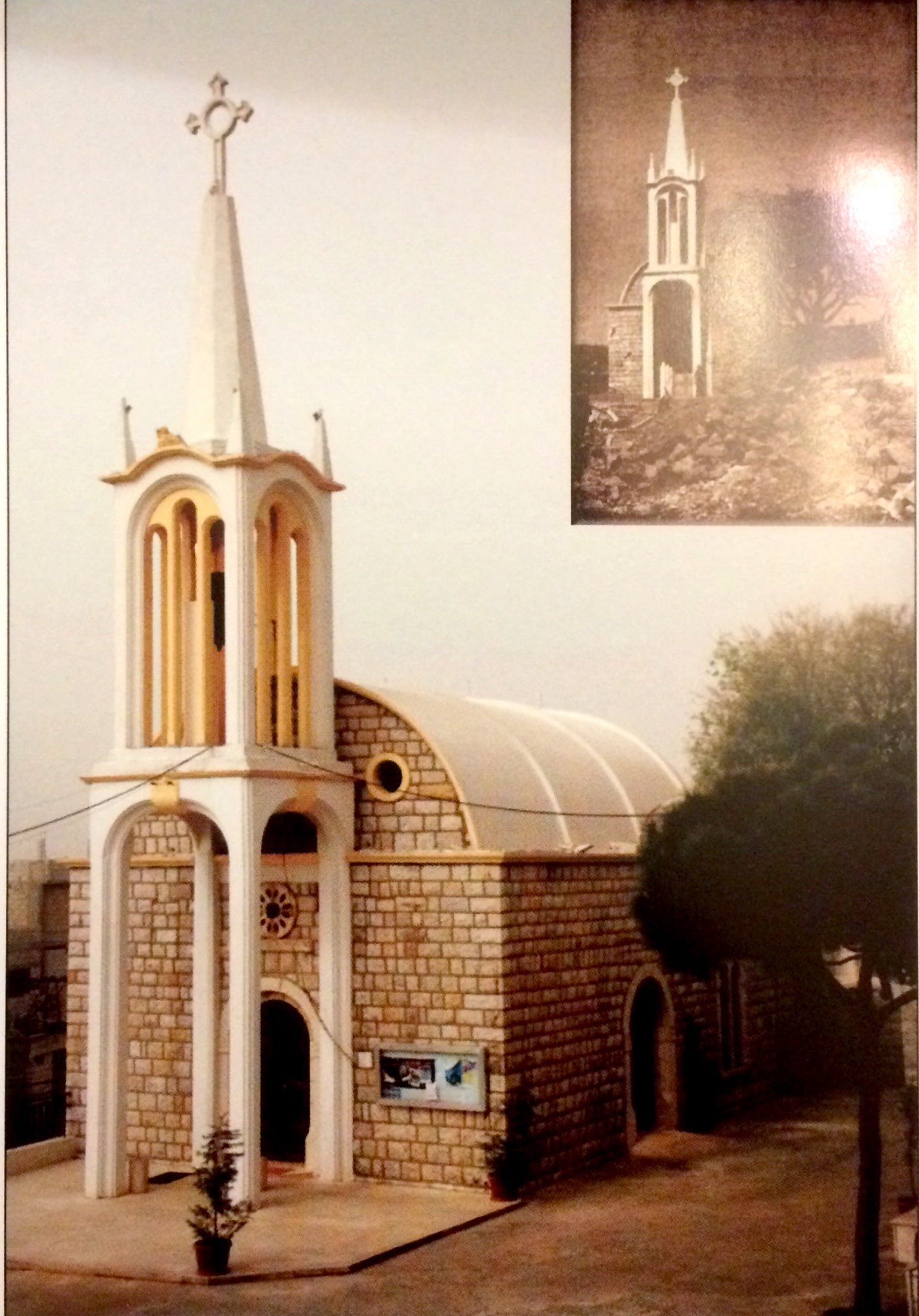
Salvation Church

translated to “the salvation”, was built in 1889. There is a copy of a painting of the Madonna in Cabela Sistine in the Vatican, by the Italian artist Rafael in the Al-Khalas church. The myth says that one of the priests tried to carry the painting from the Al-Wardieh church to Al-Khalas church, but it would miraculously go back to its original place during the night.

Deir Mar Yohanna Al-Maamadan (Arabic: دير مار يوحنا المعمدان) : translated to “saint John the Baptist”, is the oldest monastery in Zakrit and was destroyed the first time during the year 1305 during the Keserwani Nakba. In 1818 it was converted to a Patriarchal school.

Deir Mar Abda Al-Mushammar (Arabic: دير مار عبدا المشمّر)

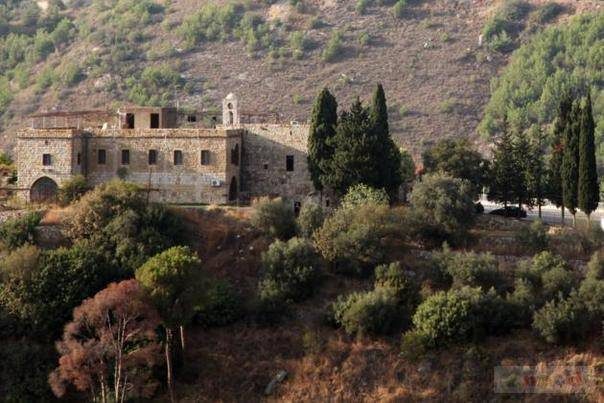
Deir Mar Abda

translated to “the sad guardian”, was built on the north-west hill of Zakrit overlooking the valley of Naher al-Kaleb. The church was built over the ruins of an ancient pagan temple. While the exact date of its building is debated upon, Patriarch Estephan Al-Douaihy mentions in his book “the history of times” that the church was renovated in 1685 and the monastery was later built in 1716.

== Economy ==
Zakrit has long been known for its olive groves. Olive production was and still is a historical tradition in this small mountainous town. There are two big olive extraction mills in the Zouk el Khrab district and Naher el Kaleb District. Both still use traditional methods of extraction. The granite industry and trading represent the largest form of income for the town. Scattered all around the industrial zone, granite factories amount to around 5 in a whole.

== Attraction ==
Aside from its religious historical touristic attractions, Zakrit holds the biggest zoo in Lebanon “Animal City”. In a joint venture operation, Gathas Group has built and managed on a 26000 sq. Meters the “Animal City” containing a Big Zoo (200 species of animals), a large entertaining area for children and games. Mar Yohanna covenant was partially transformed into a wedding and event venue names “Domaine de Zakrit”.

=== Culture ===
Zakrit has known many religious, cultural and sport organizations and movements, these organization enjoyed even more rights with the creation of the Christian Lebanese Scouts in 1965. Musical band: in 1972, Professor Kamal Morcos founded a musical school at his own residence in Zakrit. The school evolved to host a brass musical band that was known as the “Funfair music of Zakrit”.

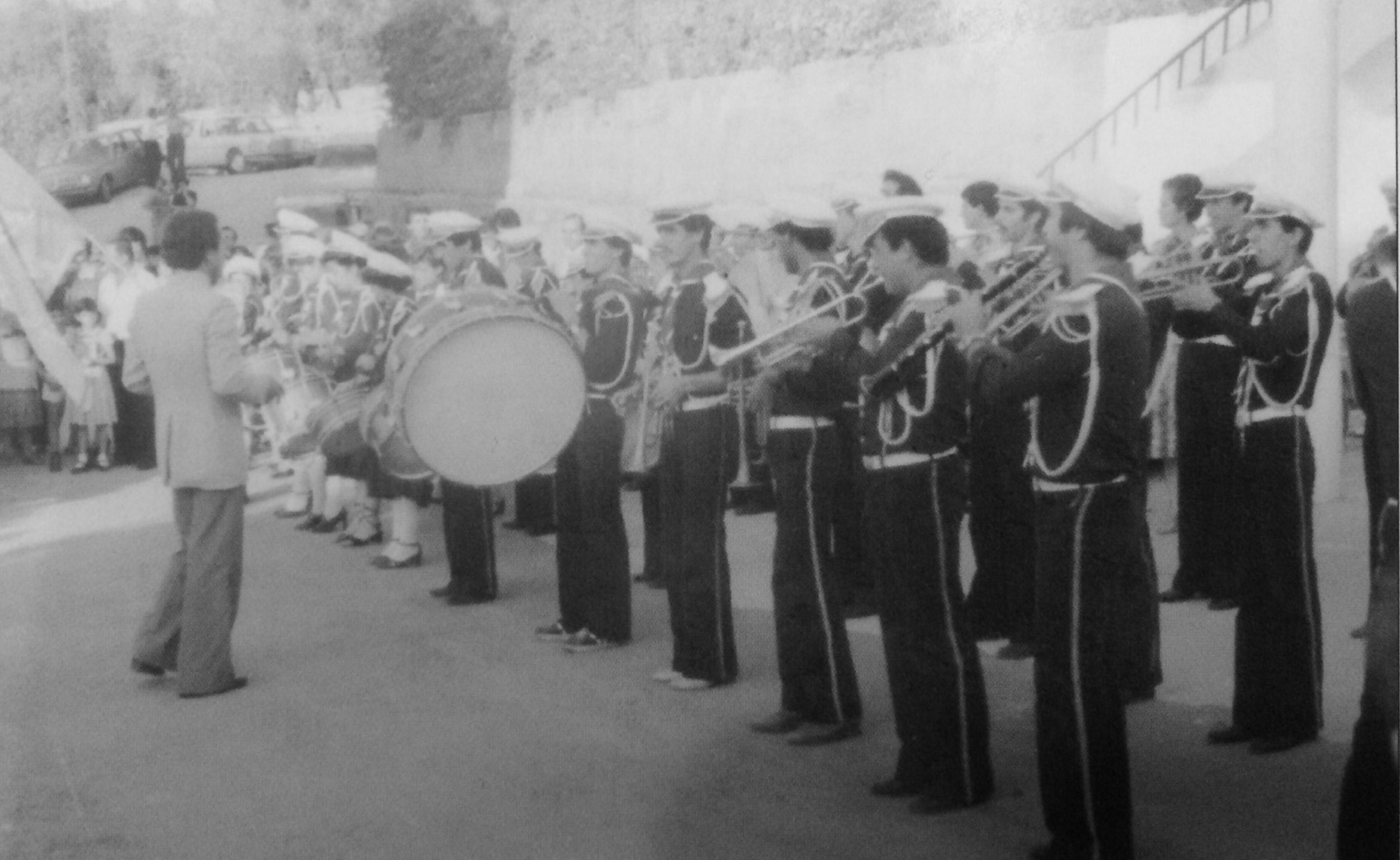
Funfair band zakrit

=== Festivals ===
Festivals are often held in Summer, and range from masses to theatre plays and entertainment shows, as well as art nights and rural dinners. The biggest festival in Zakrit is held on the 15th of August celebrating the day of “our lady of salvation” and goes on for 3 consecutive days. The second most famous celebration is that of Mar Abda on the 31st of August and goes on for 2 consecutive days.

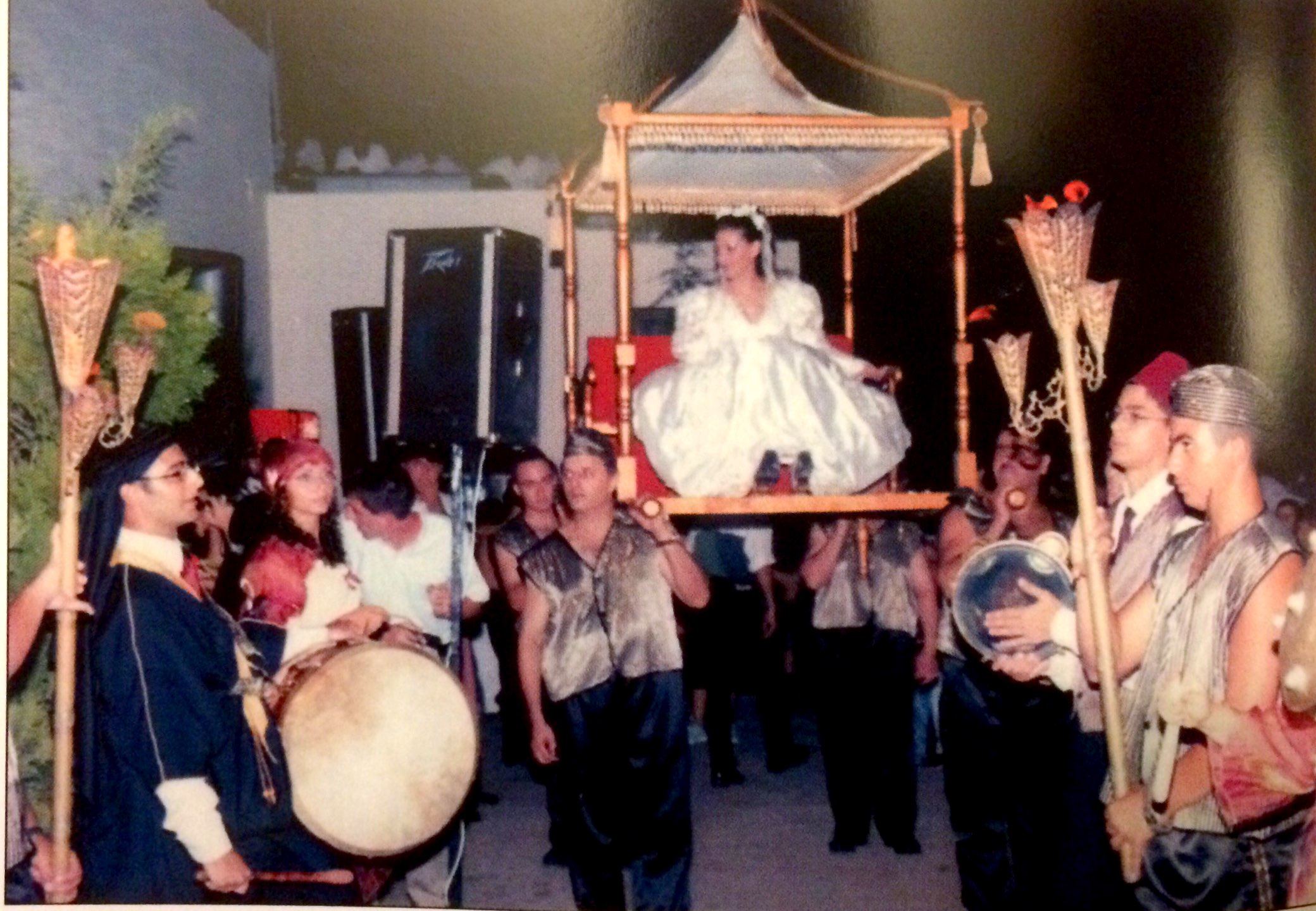
Festival Zakrit
