= Mchikha =

Mchikha مشيخا
- Village
- Location within Lebanon
- Coordinates: 33°53′12″N 35°44′46″E
- Governorate: Mount Lebanon Governorate
- District: Matn District

Government
  - Time Zone: GMT +2 (UTC)
  - - Summer (DST): +3 (UTC)

Area
  - Total: 1.77 km^{2} (0.68 sq mi)
- Highest elevation: 1,100 m (3,600 ft)
- Lowest elevation: 1,000 m (3,300 ft)
- Time zone: UTC+2 (EET)
  - Summer (DST): EEST

Mchikha (Arabic: مشيخا, romanized: Mshīkhā) is a Lebanese village located in the Matn District in Mount Lebanon, Lebanon.

The village is approximately 20 km away from Baabda, the capital of Mount Lebanon, and from Lebanon's capital, Beirut.

Its inhabitants are almost predominantly Maronite Catholic, with a significant minority of Greek Orthodox, Greek Catholics and Druze.
