= Michel Hayek =

Lebanese psychic and clairvoyant

Michel Hayek Nostradamus of the Middle-East
- Born: 1967 (age 58–59); Beit Chabab, Lebanon
- Website: www.michelhayek.com

Michel Hayek (Arabic: ميشال حايك) is a Lebanese psychic and clairvoyant, who created a lot of controversies through his traditional yearly New Year's Eve's television predictions appearances, which started on the LBC, and later MTV. Some have called him Nostradamus of the Middle East.

== Biography ==
Born in 1967 to a butcher, as a child he predicted about his family and friends but was not taken seriously.

He started working in the field of predictions in 1985, and traveled around the world for 13 years, drawing the attention of the media and newspapers, but it was with the launch of Arab satellite televisions that became famous.

He does not offer his prediction services to ordinary people, but has worked as a consultant to international firms in the United States, Britain and Australia. He has built relationships with the Lebanese politicians, and he claimed that over 35 percent of politicians resort to fortunetelling.

He is a businessman with investments in many areas such as real estate.

== Predictions ==
- In 2006 he did not make any predictions, because of his notoriety growing so much in the country.
- In 2020 he predicted the Beirut Port explosion by saying he pictured fire, ash and smoke at the port of Beirut.

For his 2024 predictions, he predicted an assassination in Lebanon, and two days after on 2 January 2024, an Israeli Strike on Beirut killed Saleh Al-Arouri and others.

== Skepticism ==
Skeptics see that his work depends on coincidence, and they say that the Arab Spring event was not mentioned in his predictions except in small talks that did not match the strength of the event, and that his error rate is very large and his forecasts are very generic and abstract in many cases, which could be applied to any event that happens.
