= Mezher, Lebanon =

Mezher مزهر Ծաղկաձոր
- Town
- Location in Lebanon
- Coordinates: 33°54′42″N 35°35′33″E
- Country: Lebanon
- Governorate: Mount Lebanon Governorate
- District: Matn District

Population
  - Ethnic groups: Armenians
  - Religions: Armenian Apostolic Church
- Time zone: UTC+2 (EET)
  - Summer (DST): +3

Mezher (Arabic: مزهر, Armenian: Ծաղկաձոր, Dzaghgatzor) is a small town in the Matn District of the Mount Lebanon Governorate. Mezher is administered by the municipality of Bsalim / Mezher / Majzoub.

== Population ==
It is a new town, where most of the population is Armenian. In Mezher the Armenian community has one of the top Armenian schools, Arslanian College and a socio-cultural sport club, Aghpalian. Most of the Armenians of Mezher come from Bourj Hamoud, Achrafieh, Anjar and the other old Armenian quarters.

== Famous people ==
Garo Agopian - Folk singer. Li Mezher - Model

== See also ==
- Armenians in Lebanon
- Bourj Hamoud
- Anjar
- Antelias
