= Ain el Safssaf =

Ain el Safssaf عين الصفصاف
- City
- Location within Lebanon
- Coordinates: 33°54′6″N 35°43′47″E
- Country: Lebanon
- Governorate: Mount Lebanon Governorate
- District: Matn District

Government
  - Time Zone: GMT +2 (UTC)
  - - Summer (DST): +3 (UTC)
  - Area Code(s): (+961) 4

Area
  - Total: 1.77 km^{2} (0.68 sq mi)
- Highest elevation: 1,100 m (3,600 ft)
- Lowest elevation: 1,000 m (3,300 ft)
- Time zone: UTC+2 (EET)
  - Summer (DST): UTC+3 (EEST)
- Dialing code: +961

Ain el Safssaf (Arabic: عين الصفصاف, romanized: ʿAyn aṣ-Ṣafṣāf, also Ain es-Sofsaf, is a village in the Matn District of the Mount Lebanon Governorate, Lebanon. Its inhabitants are predominantly Maronites.

== Overview ==
The townspeople celebrate Saint Elias Day by organizing a village dinner on the eve of July 20, bringing together the townspeople in the courtyard of Saint Elias Church.

== Etymology ==
Ain El-Safsaf was named after the willow tree (in Arabic: ṣafṣāf صفصاف) that grew near the spring of water there.

== Geography ==
Ain el Safssaf is 31 km (19 mi) to Beirut. Elevation is approx. 1,050 m (3,440 ft) above sea level.

== Demographics ==
As of 2004, Ain el Safssaf houses a population of 902. Electorate includes 1165 voters.
