= George Abdullah Ghanim =

Lebanese poet (1924–1992)

- Born: 1924
- Died: 1992 (aged 67–68)
- Occupation: Poet

George Abdullah Ghanim (Arabic:جورج عبد الله غانم) (1992- 1924) was a Lebanese poet. He was born into a family that loves literature in Baskinta, Matn district. His father was also a poet. George studied in his hometown and then in Beirut and graduated with a Bachelor of Arts in Political Sciences from the Lebanese Academy in Beirut. He also was assigned as the head of the Department of Fine Arts in the Ministry of National Education, and taught Arabic literature at the Lebanese University and the Institute of Wisdom. Ghanim also founded the Al-Thuraya literary circle in 1956. George Abdullah Ghanim is known to have many poetry collections.

== Early life and career ==
George Abdullah Ghanim was born in Baskinta, Matn District, in 1932. His father is the poet Abdullah Ghanim, and his brother is Robert Ghanim. He studied at the Nuns of Charity School in his hometown, then at the School of Wisdom and the School of Lycée, and at the Lebanese Academy in Beirut. He graduated with a bachelor's degree in political science and obtained a master's degree in Economic Sciences, a bachelor's degree in arts, and a Diploma in Educational Planning.

Ghanim worked in teaching, administration, and journalism. He moved between several administrative positions and was chosen as a member of the Lebanese Writers Union. He founded the Literary Association of Baskinta in 1955, and was its first president. Then he founded the literary episode "Al Thuraya" in 1956 with Edmond Rizk, Michel Nehme, Shawky Abi Chakra, Anwar Salman and others. He participated in the establishment of the Northern Matn Council for Culture, the Lebanese Writers Union, the House of the Lebanese Artist, the Academy of Lebanese Thought, the National Cultural Council, the Literary Salon, and the Scientific Wisdom Academy, and he headed some of these institutions.

Ghanim was also assigned as the head of the Department of Fine Arts in the Ministry of National Education in 1965, and continued as its head for fifteen years until 1980, when he resigned from the national functions. 12 years later, George Ghanim died on June 2, 1992.

== Personal life ==
George Ghanim married Noha Khalil Salmon in 1962, and had four children: Zeina, Nada, Mia and Abdullah. His brothers are Robert, Ghaleb and Rafeeq.

== Awards and achievements ==
- 1949: Poetry Prize for secondary students in Lebanon.
- 1974: State Prize in Poetry.
- The Lebanese state awarded him a medal after his death.
- 2001: A monument was erected in his hometown as a tribute for him.

== Publications ==
- Autumn Flowers, (1955)
- The Call of the Far, (1957)
- Campers, (1960)
- Travel of Words, (1966)
- The Stone of Love and Poems of Joy, (1968)
- Poets and Opinions: Research and Thoughts, (1971)
- Coming Without Winds: Words and Songs, (1973)
- On the Borders of Oblivion, (1980)
- Mirrors of Dust, (1983)
- Love Poems, (1989)
- Studies and Thoughts on 24 Poets from 1900 to 1970
- Voices Beyond Borders: Literary Studies, (1993)
