= El Qnaitra =

El Qnaitra القنيطرة
- Municipality
- Location within Lebanon
- Coordinates: 33°53′12″N 35°44′46″E
- Governorate: Mount Lebanon Governorate
- District: Matn District

Government
  - Time Zone: GMT +2 (UTC)
  - - Summer (DST): +3 (UTC)

Area
  - Total: 1.77 km^{2} (0.68 sq mi)
- Highest elevation: 1,100 m (3,600 ft)
- Lowest elevation: 1,000 m (3,300 ft)
- Time zone: UTC+2 (EET)
  - Summer (DST): EEST

El Qnaitra (Arabic: القنيطرة, romanized: al-Qunayṭrah) is a municipality located in the Matn District of the Mount Lebanon Governorate in Lebanon.

== Demographics ==
In 2014, Muslims made up 99.80% of registered voters in El Qnaitra. 98.58% of the voters were Shiite Muslims.
