= Mazraat Yachouh =

Mazraat Yachouh مزرعة يشوع
- City
- Location within Lebanon
- Coordinates: 33°55′N 35°38′E
- Country: Lebanon
- Governorate: Mount Lebanon Governorate
- District: Matn District

Government
- Elevation: 376 m (1,234 ft)
- Time zone: UTC+2 (EET)
  - Summer (DST): UTC+3 (EEST)
- Dialing code: +961

Mazraat Yachouh (Arabic: مزرعة يشوع, romanized: Mazraʿat Yashūʿ, French: Municipalité de Mazraat Yachoua), also spelled Mazraat Yachouaa, is a municipality in the Matn District of the Mount Lebanon Governorate of Lebanon, situated approximately 16km east of Beirut. In 2006, the municipality had two public schools and one private school, with enrollments of 299 and 218 students, respectively.

== Etymology ==
The exact origin of the village name Mazraat Yachouh is unknown, but the name is Arabic for "Jacob Farm."

== Demographics and Government ==
2010 government data indicated the city had a resident population of 1,453 registered voters. The Mazraat Yachouh city council contains nine elected councilmen (Arabic: موظفو مجلس المدينة), with two members of the selected workforce (Arabic: القوى العاملة المختارة).

== Geography ==
Mazraat Yachouh is located at 33.55°N 35.38°E. It is situated in central Lebanon, east of Beirut, west of the town of Bikfaya, and south west of Mount Sannine.

== Religion ==
Consistent with the majority of the Matn District, the inhabitants of Mazraat Yachouh are predominantly Maronites.
