= Youssef Habchi el-Achkar =

Lebanese writer

Youssef Habchi el-achkar
- Born: 1929
- Died: 1992 (aged 62–63)
- Citizenship: Lebanon
- Education: Saint Joseph University (USJ)

Youssef Habchi el-Achkar (1929-1992) was a Lebanese writer. He was known as "The Father of the Modern Lebanese Novel."

== Education ==
He attended elementary and middle school in Beit Chabab (1934 to 1941) and completed high school at Saint Joseph School" (SJS) in 1948. In 1951 he graduated with a degree in law and philosophy from Saint Joseph University (USJ) in Beirut.

== Career ==
Youssef Habchi al-Achkar said in one of the dialogues about writing: "The unconscious reasons why I chose a story then a novel was because I was familiar to stories at home," the first stories that I have ever read was by my father “Emile el-achkar”, which back then he wrote fourteen historical stories. He further said: "I realized that telling a story gave me the freedom to create anything I wanted, however I wanted, writing a story fits with My laziness". He Joined the “Ahlu al-Qalam” Association and the “Al-Mutan” Council for Culture, and worked at the social service organization (CNSS). His first novel was "four red mares” “ārbʿẗ āfrās ḥmr" (1964), which marked the beginning of his most important and best novel "no roots grow in the sky" "lā tnbt ǧḏwr fy ālsmāʾ" (1971), which established him as one of the most prominent novelists of the modern era, then "shadow and echo" " ālẓl w ālṣdā" (1989). He has anecdotal collections, including: "The Taste of Ash" "ṭʿm ālrmād" (1952) - "Winter Night" "lyl ālštāʾ"(1955) - "Ancient Earth" "ālārḍ ālqdymā" (1962) - "The Last of the Ancient" " āẖr ālqdmāʾ" (1985). Shawqi Abdul Amir said: "Habchi al-Ashkar is still at the top of a high mountain, not only in Lebanon, but in the Arabic narration.".

== Death ==
He died on August 5, 1992, from a heart attack.
