= Ouyoun =

Village in Mount Lebanon Governorate, Lebanon

Ouyoun العيون
- City
- Location in Lebanon
- Coordinates: 33°52′58″N 35°39′12″E
- Country: Lebanon
- Governorate: Mount Lebanon Governorate
- District: Matn District

Government
  - Time Zone: GMT +2 (UTC)
  - - Summer (DST): +3 (UTC)
  - Area Code(s): (+961) 4

Area
  - Total: 10 km^{2} (3.9 sq mi)
- Time zone: UTC+2 (EET)
  - Summer (DST): UTC+3 (EEST)
- Dialing code: +961

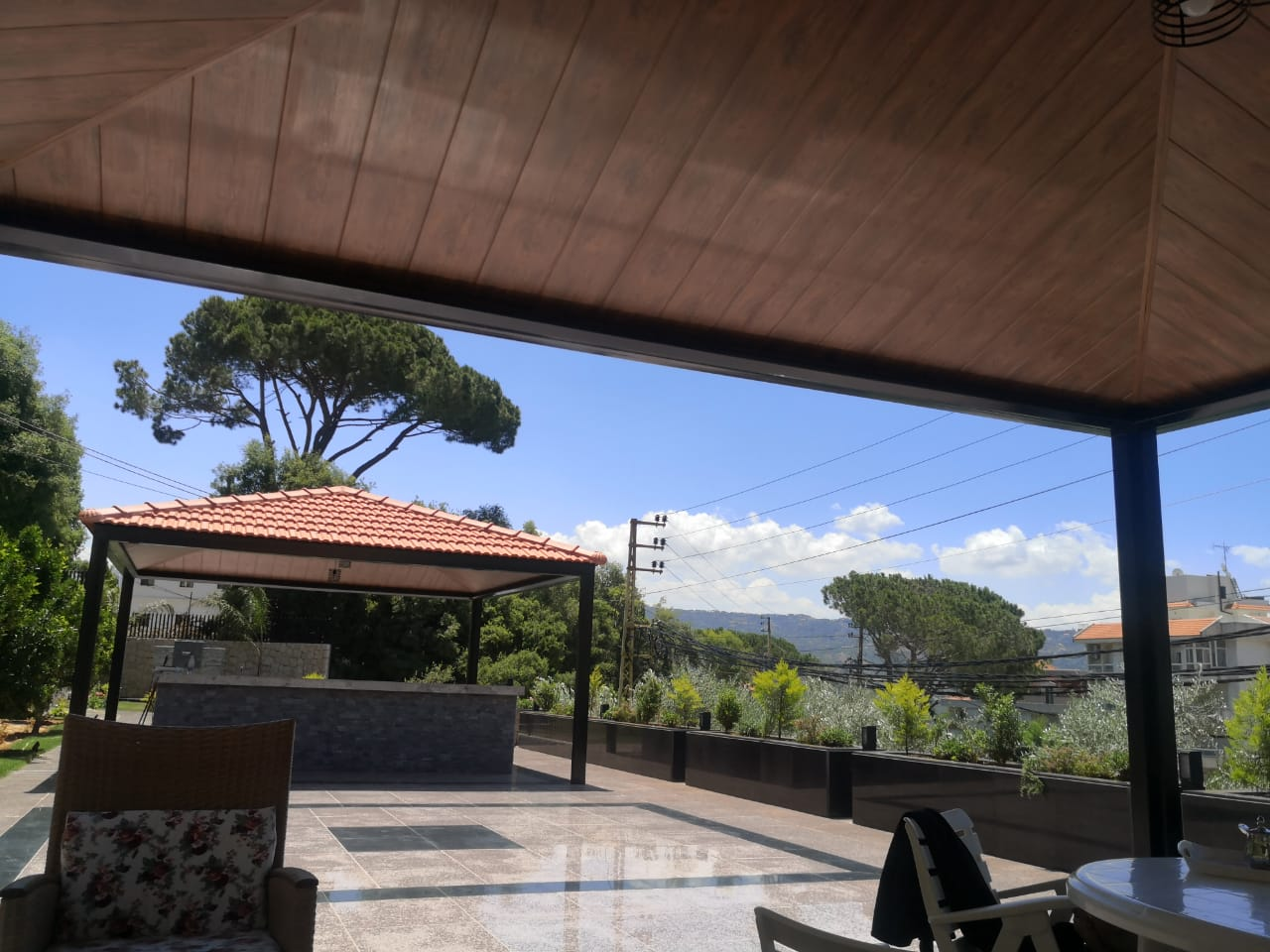
Ouyoun Entrance

Ouyoun (Arabic: العيون, romanized: al-ʿAyūn) is a village in Mount Lebanon, Lebanon.

== Overview ==
Ouyoun or Aiyoun is a village in Mount Lebanon, Lebanon. It is mostly known for its rolling verdant hills, pine forest trees, and water springs.

== Etymology ==
The name 'Ouyoun' means springs in Arabic. The name is given because of the many water springs that are there.

== Geography ==
Ouyoun is located east of Brummana. Area is about 10 km2. It is located 800 meters(2624 feet) above sea level and 10 miles (16 km) east of Beirut.

Ouyoun's inhabitants are mainly from the Abou Diwan family, with many inhabitants also from the Chakhtoura family.

== Demographics ==
The demographics of Ouyoun are all followers of the Christian faith with majority being the Maronite and Syriac Catholic with minorities being Greek Catholic and Greek Orthodox.
