= Mar Moussa =

Town in Lebanon in the Matn District of Mount Lebanon Governorate

Mar Moussa مار موسى
- City
- Location within Lebanon
- Coordinates: 33.90°N 35.685°E
- Country: Lebanon
- Governorate: Mount Lebanon Governorate
- District: Matn District
- Highest elevation: 1,150 m (3,770 ft)
- Lowest elevation: 900 m (3,000 ft)
- Time zone: UTC+2 (EET)
  - Summer (DST): UTC+3 (EEST)
- Dialing code: +961

Mar Moussa (Arabic: مار موسى, romanized: Mār Mūssā, also spelled Mar-Moussa) is a town in Lebanon in the Matn District of Mount Lebanon Governorate. It is 25 km (16 mi) from Beirut at an altitude ranging between 900 and 1,150 metres (2,950 and 3,770 ft) above sea level.

== History ==
In 1753, a group of Lebanese monks built the monastery of Mar Moussa Al-Habshi over the remains of an old Roman sanctuary. In later years, migrant families from Byblos, Chbaniyé, and Bikfaya settled in the area, where they were employed to cultivate the monastery's lands. Gradually, the community grew into the village called Mar Moussa Ed-Douar. With government financial assistance in the 1950s, the resident farmers obtained ownership of the land and began expanding the village. Since then, many villas and houses have been built in the surrounding area, which is full of pine trees. The village's most prominent landmarks are the monastery and the windmill.

== Demography ==
The inhabitants of Mar Moussa are followers of the Maronite Catholic Church.

== Religious structures ==
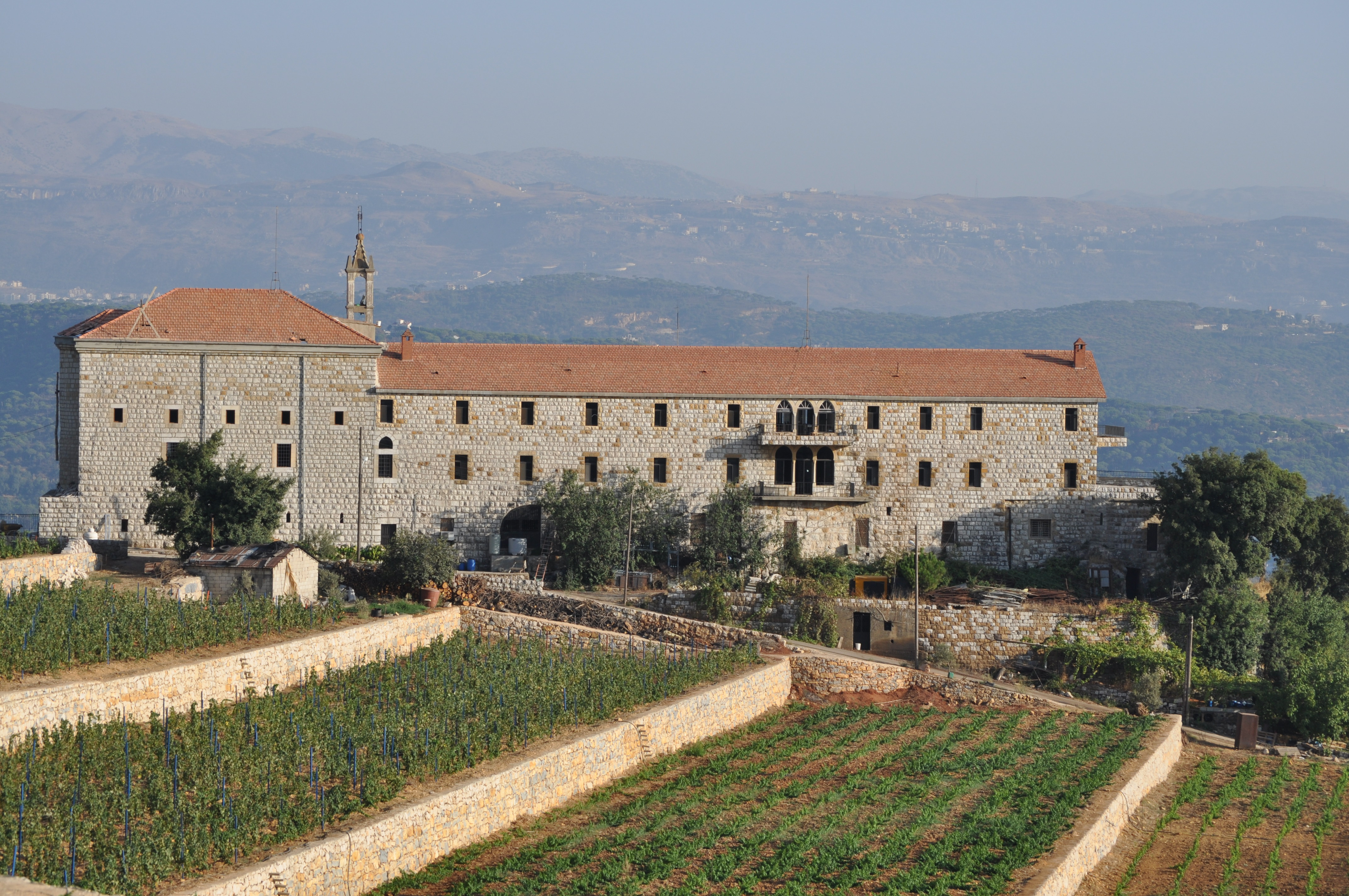
Deir Mar-Moussa 2010

Like most mountain villages in Lebanon, Mar Moussa is home to a historic Maronite monastery: Deir Mar Moussa (Saint Moussa Monastery). Built in 1753, Deir Mar Moussa Al-Habshi is constructed of white stones and consists of several long buildings with bricks on top, surrounded by trees. It was built over the remains of an old sanctuary. In the monastery there is a small church dedicated to St. Charbel and shrines for St. Rafqa (a Maronite Lebanese nun beatified in 1985 and canonized in 2001) and Na’amatallah Al-Hardini (a Lebanese monk who was declared venerable in 1989, beatified in 1998, and canonized on 16 May 2004). The courtyard of Deir Mar Moussa overlooks terraces and the pine mountains of Bzebdine, as well as Mount Kneysseh.
