= Kaakour =

Kaakour القعقور
- Village
- Location in Lebanon
- Coordinates: 33°53′36″N 35°43′1″E
- Country: Lebanon
- Governorate: Mount Lebanon
- District: Matn
- Elevation: 3,050 ft (930 m)
- Time zone: UTC+2 (EET)
  - Summer (DST): +3

El Kaakour or Qaaqour (Arabic: القعقور, romanized: al-Qaʿqūr) is a small village in the Matn District of Lebanon. It's about 930 meters above sea level. It's located in a very mountainous area surrounded by pine trees. All people born in Kaakour are Maronite of the following families: Mazloum, Ashkar, Jerdak, Abou Antoun

Population: around 2000

The families Abou Antoun and Mazloum share a common heritage, both families migrated from Tartij to Kaakour in the 17th century

== See also ==
- Catholic Church in Lebanon
