= Ain el Sendianeh =

Ain el Sendianeh عين السنديانة
- Village
- Location within Lebanon
- Coordinates: 33°54′00″N 35°42′00″E
- Governorate: Mount Lebanon Governorate
- District: Matn District

Government
  - Time Zone: GMT +2 (UTC)
  - - Summer (DST): +3 (UTC)

Area
  - Total: 1.77 km^{2} (0.68 sq mi)
- Highest elevation: 1,100 m (3,600 ft)
- Lowest elevation: 1,000 m (3,300 ft)
- Time zone: UTC+2 (EET)
  - Summer (DST): EEST

Ain el Sendianeh (Arabic: عين السنديانة, romanized: ʿAyn as-Sindiyāneh) is a Lebanese village located in the Matn District in Mount Lebanon, Lebanon.
