= Mrouj =

Municipality in Matn District, Mount Lebanon

Mrouj المروج
- City
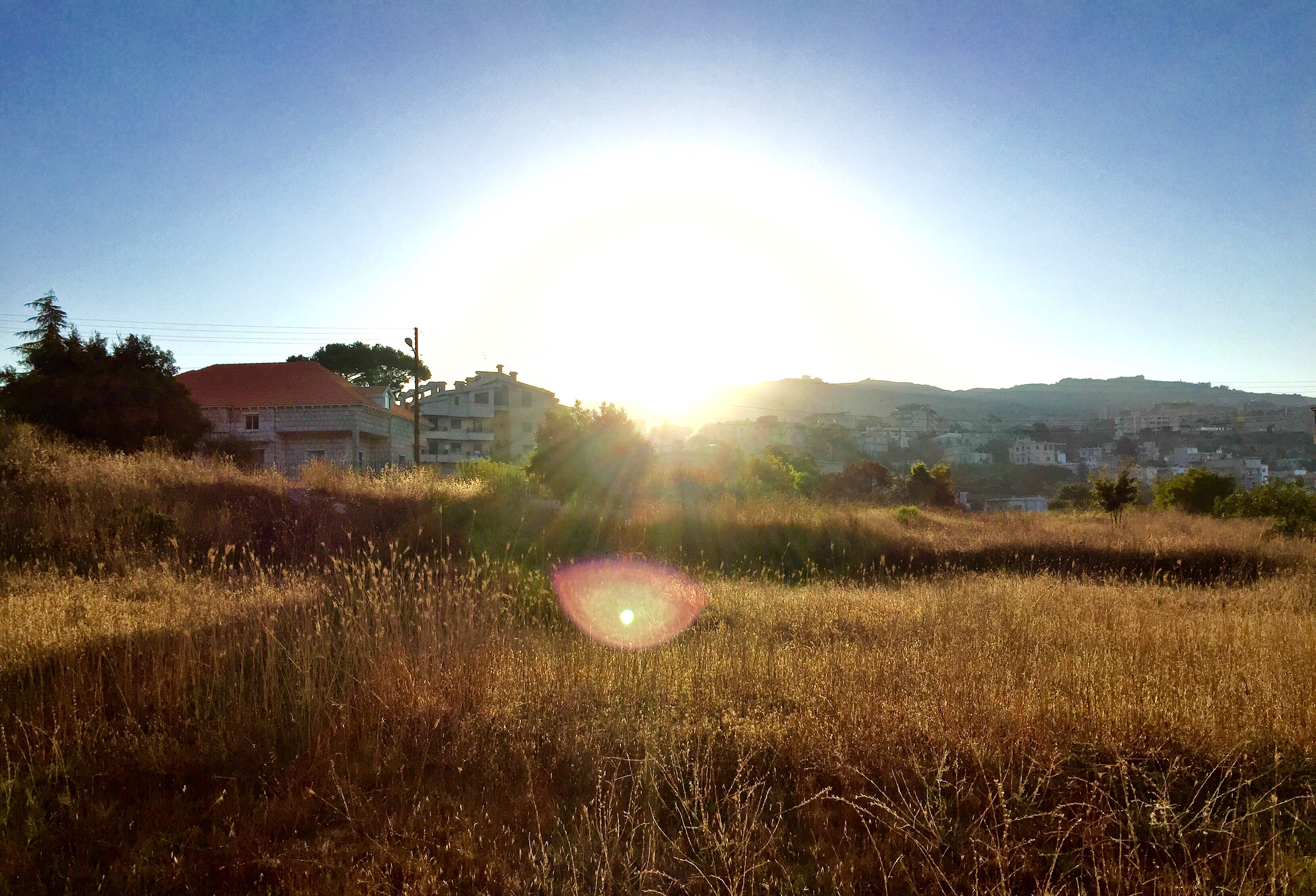
- Mrouj, 2015

- Location within Lebanon
- Coordinates: 33°54′45″N 35°44′57″E
- Country: Lebanon
- Governorate: Mount Lebanon Governorate
- District: Matn District
- Elevation: 1,220 m (4,000 ft)
- Time zone: UTC+2 (EET)
  - Summer (DST): UTC+3 (EEST)
- Dialing code: +961

Mrouj (Arabic: المروج, romanized: al-Mrūj, also spelled Mrouje and El Mrouj) is a municipality in the Matn District of the Mount Lebanon Governorate of Lebanon. The English translation of Mrouj is "The Meadows"

== Location ==
Mrouj is one of the Lebanese villages of the Metn district in Mount Lebanon. Mrouj overlooks Mount Sannine, Beskenta and Kesrouan to the north, and Metn south to the south.

Elevation is 1,220 meters above sea level and is about 32 km from the capital Beirut. It is surrounded by a group of neighboring villages, the most important Bologna, wata El Muroj, El Mtein, Marjaba, and Al-Zaarour ski resort 6 kilometers north of Mrouj.

The village also promotes summer vacations to escape the heat and oppressive humidities of coastal cities.

== The Church and Feast of Saint Takla ==
In 1792, the Lebanese Maronite Order assumed control of the old church built in El-Mrouj for Saint Takla and later built a new church. The Feast of Saint Takla is celebrated on September 24. Celebrations kick off around the beginning of September, with tents set up in the village square for selling sweets and toys. Also, a village dinner and parties are organized shortly before the Feast Day. In the past, competition involved lifting a Kibbeh mortar, a stone roller, and weights; bell-striking; and organizing a horse race. They would also bring the “Box of Wonders” (Soundouk El Ferje), and people would pay five piasters to view the series of pictures inside, unfolding one after the other.

== Education ==
In the past, there were many schools in El-Mrouj: Saint Takla School; The English School, which has become today an Evangelical church; the Intermediate Public School, which has closed; and the Social Guidance School, which has become today an orphanage and a social institution for the Antonine Fathers.

== Clubs ==
In El-Mrouj, the Youth Sports Club was established in 1946. In 1969, the Phoenician Youth Club, which aimed to activate all social, cultural, artistic, and sports movements, was established.

== Oak Trees ==
In 1942, Decree 434 was issued to protect the site of El-Mrouj oak trees. Today, only one oak tree has remained in the village square.

== Water ==
Lake Mrouj is located approximately 3 km north of the town. It is a source of water for many villages in the Matn District

== Economy ==
Mrouj is mostly a destination for summer tourism for Beirutis in the summer and ski enthusiasts in the winter. Zaarour ski resorts are about 6 km north of Mrouj.

The town also hosts an annual festival for St. Takla in September in the St. Takla Square in the center of Mrouj.

== Religion ==
The inhabitants of Mrouj are all Christians, predominantly Maronites.
