= Cornet Chahwan =

Village in Mount Lebanon, Lebanon

Cornet Chahwan قرنة شهوان
- Village
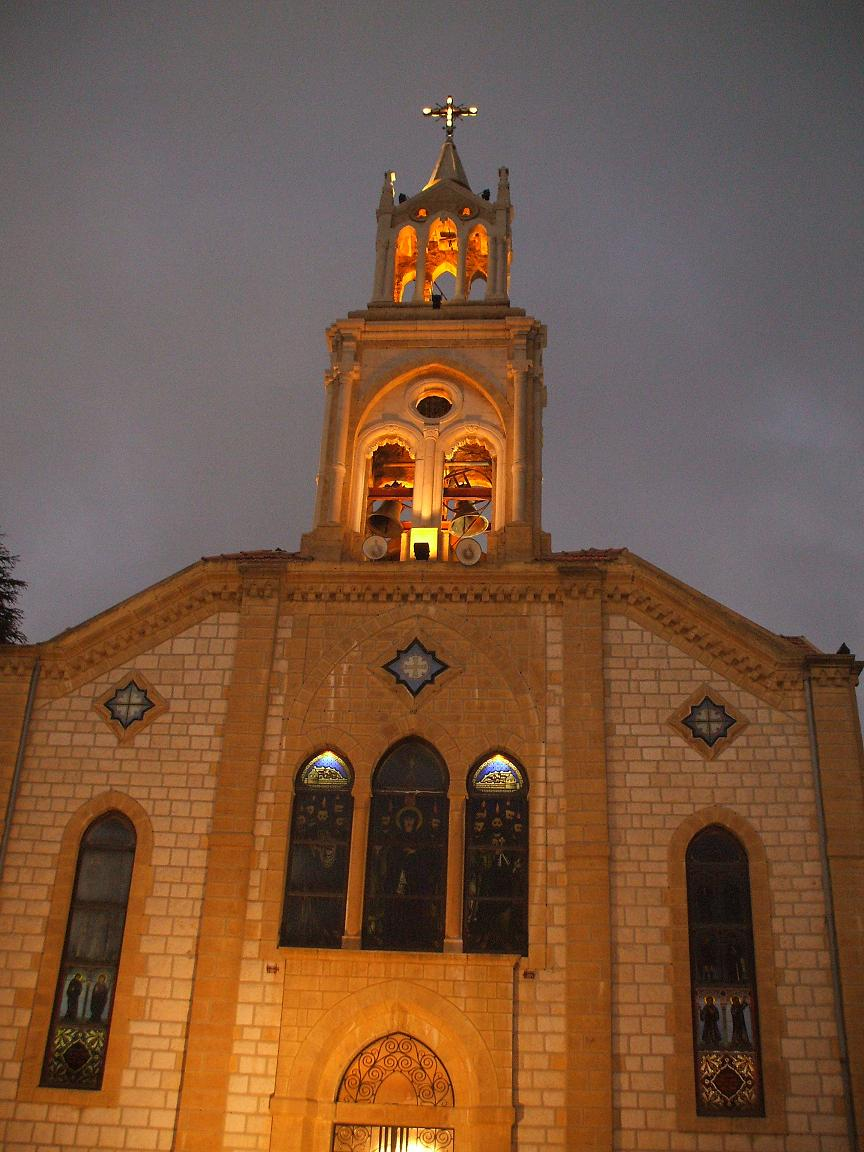
- The Church of Sts. Peter & Paul

- Location within Lebanon
- Coordinates: 33.92°N 35.67°E
- Country: Lebanon
- Governorate: Mount Lebanon Governorate
- District: Matn District
- Elevation: 680 m (2,230 ft)
- Highest elevation: 750 m (2,460 ft)
- Lowest elevation: 150 m (490 ft)

Population
  - Total: 28,000
- Time zone: UTC+2 (EET)
  - Summer (DST): UTC+3 (EEST)
- Dialing code: +961
- Website: www.chab.gov.lb

Cornet Chahwan (Arabic: قرنة شهوان, romanized: Qurnat Shahwān, also spelled Kornet Chehwan) is a sizable town in the Mount Lebanon area of Lebanon's Metn District. Cornet Chahwan houses the headquarters for the chab (www.chab.gov.lb) municipalities of 4 villages (including Cornet Chahwan) namely Ain Aar, Beit El Kikko, Hbous and Rabweh. The total area governed by chab municipalities is around 8 million square meters, out of which over 30% is covered by green spaces. The town remains one of the best residential areas in Lebanon. The President of Chab municipalities, since 2010, is Jean Pierre Gebara.

== Demography ==
There are over 6,000 households and 30,000 inhabitants in the chab Municipalities that are Lebanese and most are followers of the Catholic Church. The town is the seat of the Maronite Archbishopric of Matn. The town has numerous churches, including the historic Saint Peter & Paul Church.

== Education ==
Cornet Chahwan is home to numerous private educational institutes, including three private schools, Saint Joseph school, Jesus & Mary school founded, and International College, Beirut (Ain Aar campus). Saint Coeur is a semi private school also located in Kornet Chahwan.

== Culture ==
The town is home to the Pharès Zoghbi Cultural Foundation, which is a library of 65,000 books in French, English, Spanish, Portuguese, and Arabic.

The town is also home to theater at Saint Joseph School in addition to a city hall next to St Peter & Paul's church.

== Humanitarian Institutions ==
St Vincent de Paul, a charitable institution, is located in Cornet Chahwan. The Lebanese Red Cross also has a first-aid center in the town. There is also a fire department covering vast areas of the El Metn district.
