= Rabieh =

Rabieh الرابية
- City
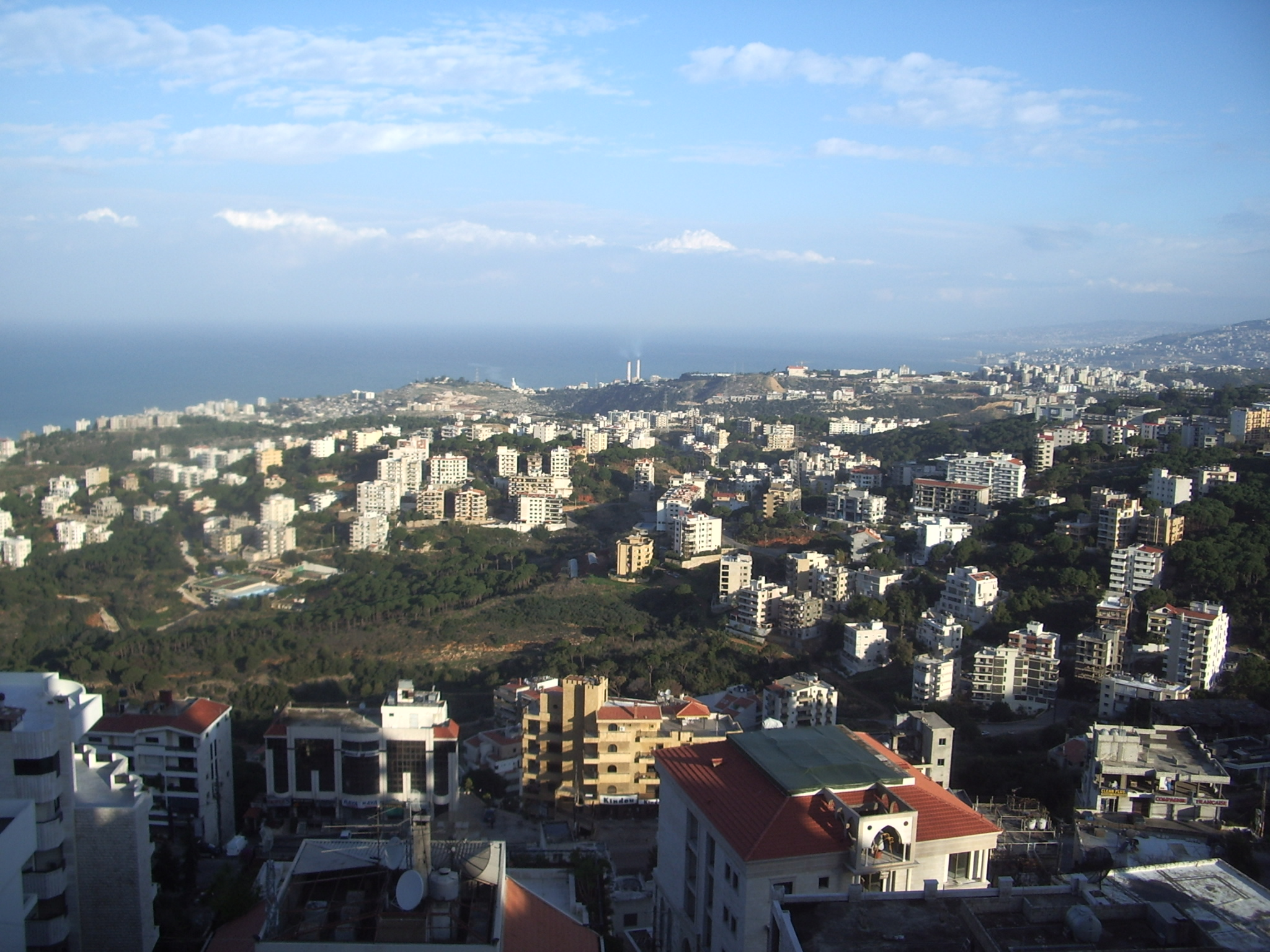
- Overview of Rabieh

- Location within Lebanon
- Coordinates: 33°55′12″N 35°36′8.6″E
- Country: Lebanon
- Governorate: Mount Lebanon Governorate
- District: Matn District
- Time zone: UTC+2 (EET)
  - Summer (DST): UTC+3 (EEST)
- Dialing code: +961

Rabieh (Arabic: الرابية) is a suburban area on the northern edge of Greater Beirut, Lebanon, about 13 kilometers driving distance from Beirut. It is located in the foothills of Mount Lebanon, on the road to Bikfaya. Rabieh saw its population increase sharply in the late 1980s, following the Lebanese civil war. Rabieh is famous for its biodiversity and ecological richness.

Rabieh has a geo-strategic location, it is only 15 to 20 minutes away from the vibrant capital Beirut, and is a minute's drive from the Bikfaya highway.

Despite its proximity to the capital, Rabieh's population density is relatively low. It is situated at 200–300 m above sea level.

Its inhabitants are almost predominantly Maronite Catholic, with a significant minority of Melkites and Greek Orthodox followers.
