= Douar =

Ed-Douar الدوار
- Village
- Location within Lebanon
- Coordinates: 33°50′39″N 35°39′35″E
- Country: Lebanon
- Governorate: Mount Lebanon Governorate
- District: Matn District
- Time zone: UTC+2 (EET)
  - Summer (DST): UTC+3 (EEST)
- Dialing code: +961

Douar or Ed-Douar (Arabic: الدوار, romanized: ad-Duwār) is small, mainly Maronite, village located in the Metn District of the Mount Lebanon Governorate of Lebanon. Douar means "round about". Its inhabitants are predominantly Maronite Catholic.

== Location ==
The municipality of Douar is located in the Kaza of Matn, in the mohafazat (governorate) of Mount Lebanon. Just above the town of Bikfaya from the east and Mar Moussa from the south, Douar is 28 kilometers (17 miles) from Beyrouth (Beirut), the capital of Lebanon. Its elevation is between 1050 and 1150 meters above sea level. Douar stretches on a hilly area of 132 hectares (1.32 square kilometres; 0.51 square miles).

== See also ==
- Christianity in Lebanon
