= Marjaba =

Lebanese village

Coordinates: 33°54′59″N 35°45′09″E

Marjaba (Arabic: مرجبا, romanized: Marjabā) is a Lebanese village located in the Matn District in Mount Lebanon, Lebanon. The population is almost exclusively Christian.
