= Mkalles =

Mkalles المكلس
- City
- Location within Lebanon
- Coordinates: 33°52′N 35°33′E
- Country: Lebanon
- Governorate: Mount Lebanon Governorate
- District: Matn District

Government
  - Time Zone: GMT +2 (UTC)
  - - Summer (DST): +3 (UTC)
  - Area Code(s): (+961) 1

Area
  - Total: 1.32 km^{2} (0.51 sq mi)
- Time zone: UTC+2 (EET)
  - Summer (DST): UTC+3 (EEST)
- Dialing code: +961

Mkalles (Arabic: المكلس translit. al-Mkalles) is a town in the Matn District of the Mount Lebanon Governorate, Lebanon. Mkalles is administered by Mansourieh municipality.
