= Sisters of the Holy Childhood of Jesus and Mary =

The Sisters of the Holy Infancy of Jesus and Mary, known also as Sisters of Ste-Chrétienne (SSCH), are a Roman Catholic international congregation founded in 1807 by Anne-Victoire Méjanes, née Tailleux, for the education of girls and the care of the sick poor.

== History ==
At the invitation of bishop Jauffret of Metz, Méjanes and her community went from Argancy to Metz and took up their abode in the Abbey of St. Glossinde, where, on 20 April 1807, they bound themselves by vow to follow the statutes drawn up for them by the bishop. The congregation received the approval of the Holy See in 1888, and its statutes were granted papal approbation in 1899.

In 1903, a group of sisters arrived in Salem, Massachusetts to manage a school, where they taught students in both English and French, the latter being the native language of many of the pupils, almost half of whom were from families of French-Canadian immigrants. St. Joseph's Convent School was destroyed in the Great Salem fire of 1914. St. Chretienne Academy was opened in 1918, and was quickly converted to a sixty-bed hospital for victims of the Influenza epidemic. St. Chretienne Academy High School was opened in 1964. Both closed in 1971. The property is now the site of the Salem State University South Campus.

The novitiate of the congregation was moved to Giffard, Quebec where the sisters ran two schools.

During World War I, the sisters in Europe cared for the wounded in hospitals, or turned their convents into hospitals. Many of them received the Legion of Honor and were awarded medals by the French and other governments.

== Present day ==
As of 2019 there were about 200 sisters. The sisters have houses in France, Austria, Georgia, Canada, and the United States. In the United States, they minister in Massachusetts, Rhode Island, Maine and Florida; the office for the US Region is in Wrentham, Massachusetts.

In 1970, they arrived in Rwanda, where they direct health centers.
