= Zalka =

Zalka زلقا
- City
- Location in Lebanon
- Coordinates: 33°53′56″N 35°34′39″E
- Country: Lebanon
- Governorate: Mount Lebanon
- District: Matn
- Elevation: 98 ft (30 m)
- Time zone: UTC+2 (EET)
  - Summer (DST): +3

Zalka or Zalqa (Arabic: زلقا, romanized: Zalqā), part of Zalka - Amaret Chalhoub is a suburban area located in the northern part of Beirut, the capital city of Lebanon. It is a residential and commercial district that is known for its bustling shopping streets, restaurants, cafes, and nightlife.

Zalka is situated on the hills overlooking Beirut and is bordered by the neighborhoods of Jal El Dib to the north, Antelias to the east, and Sin El Fil to the south. It is easily accessible by car or public transportation and is located only a few kilometers away from the Beirut Central District.

The area was originally a small village that grew rapidly during the 20th century as Beirut expanded. Today, it is a densely populated area that is home to people of different religions and ethnic backgrounds. The majority of the population are Christian, almost predominantly Maronite Catholic.

Zalka is a hub of economic activity, with a wide range of businesses, including banks, insurance companies, and law firms.

In addition to its commercial and residential areas, Zalka also has several cultural and educational institutions, including the St.Famille Zalka, St. Georges Zalka. The area also has several historic churches and other religious sites, including the St. Elias Maronite Church and the Maronite Patriarchate.

== Landmarks and Attractions ==
Churches: Zalka is home to several important churches and shrines, such as Our Lady of Zalka, a revered Marian shrine that attracts visitors for prayer and pilgrimage, especially during religious festivities.
