= Bsalim =

Bsalim بصاليم
- Location within Lebanon
- Coordinates: 33°54′6″N 35°36′16″E
- Country: Lebanon
- Governorate: Mount Lebanon Governorate
- Districts of Lebanon: Matn District
- Elevation: 300–400 m (980–1,310 ft)
- Time zone: +2
  - Summer (DST): +3

Bsalim (Arabic: بصاليم, romanized: Bṣālīm) is a town in the Matn District in Mount Lebanon Governorate in Lebanon. The population is almost exclusively Christian.

== Geography ==
Bsalim is located 300–400 m (980–1,310 ft) above sea level. The cities around Bsalim are Antelias, Jal el Dib, Nabey, Roumieh, Kennebat Broumana, and Bqennaya. Bsalim's municipality also contains two small districts, Mezher and Majzoub.

== Demography ==
Bsalim is home to Greek Orthodox, Maronites, Catholics, and Armenian Orthodox.

== Public services ==
In Bsalim are three churches: Saint Georges Cathedral-Greek Orthodox, Saint Mary's Church-Maronites and Christ the King Church. Schools found in Bsalim are Athene de Beyrouth and Saint Georges-Bsalim. Some important sites people visit Bsalim for is the Lebanese basketball, since the home court of Hommentnen is located in Mezher.

== History ==
During Operation Grapes of Wrath, 15 April 1996, the electrical transformer station in Bsalim was bombed by the Israeli Air Force and badly damaged, the day before a power station in Jamhour, 3 km east of Baabda had also been bombed. The air strikes left most of Beirut without electricity.

== Notable people ==
- Diana Haddad (born 1976), Lebanese singer and actress
- Muris 'Awwad (born 1934), Lebanese poet
