= Beit Chabab =

Beit Chabab بيت شباب
- City
- Location within Lebanon
- Coordinates: 33°55′38″N 35°40′21″E
- Country: Lebanon
- Governorate: Mount Lebanon Governorate
- District: Matn District
- Highest elevation: 700 m (2,300 ft)
- Lowest elevation: 600 m (2,000 ft)
- Time zone: UTC+2 (EET)
  - Summer (DST): UTC+3 (EEST)
- Dialing code: +961 4

Beit Chabab (Syriac: Bet Shebāba, Arabic: بيت شباب, romanized: Bayt Shabāb) is a mountain village 24 km north of Beirut in Lebanon.

Beit Chabeb is the site of Lebanon's one and only bell foundry. The bells of Beit Chabab are sold to Christian communities in Lebanon and abroad to many foreign countries. The village was completely embosomed in mulberry gardens at the turn of the century. The Hôpital Beit Chabab - Collège du Liban pour les handicapés is located in the village.

== History ==
Ottoman tax records indicate Beit Chabab had a population of 27 Muslim households (unspecified whether Sunni, Shia or Druze) in 1523, 32 Christian households in 1530, and 28 Christian households and two bachelors in 1543.

The oldest church in Beit Chabab is Our Lady of the Forest, which was built in 1761.

== Demographics ==
=== Religion ===
As of 2022, the religious make-up of the town's 5,704 registered voters were roughly 88.6% Maronite Catholics, 3.8% Greek Orthodox, 3.7% Greek Catholic, 1.5% Christian Minorities, and 2.4% others.

1. Maronite Catholics (88.6%)
2. Greek Orthodox (3.80%)
3. Greek Catholic (3.70%)
4. Christian Minorities (1.50%)
5. Others (2.40%)

== Etymology ==
The name "Beit Chabab" is widely believed to originate from the Arabic Bayt shabāb (meaning:"house of the young men"), but in reality it might have roots in Syriac. Anis Freiha argues in his Dictionary of the Names of Town and Villages in Lebanon that it comes from the Syriac Bet Shebāba meaning "house of the neighbor".

== Bell production ==
The local ancient family tradition of bell making has continued with craftsman Naffah Naffah, whose family has been responsible for the crafting of the bells for several generations.

The craftsman, who is keeping the family tradition of bell-making alive in Beit Chabeb, has a personal connection to the history of this craft in the region. The Naffah name itself is tied to the bell-making heritage of his distant relative, Youssef Gabriel, who learned the trade as an apprentice to Russian bell-makers who had settled in Beit Chabeb in the early 1700s. When Gabriel made his first bell, the Russians were so impressed that they bestowed upon him the name "Naffah," which means "successful" or "accomplished" in Arabic. This name has been passed down through the generations of the family.

Beit Chabeb has become a renowned regional center for the bell-making trade, thanks to the skills of the Naffah family. Their handmade bells are highly sought-after and can be found in churches throughout Lebanon, as well as in Syria, Jordan, Egypt, Iraq, and Palestine.

Bell making is meticulous and time-consuming, but Naffah has managed to maintain the family business despite being the sole craftsman. He produces around 30 to 35 bells per year, but demand for his creations continues to rise. Naffah adheres to a rigorous schedule, working from 5 am to 5 pm every day, only taking a break to collect his children from school.

== Other crafts ==
During the 1960s a researcher reports cotton weavers and potters as well as the bell founder. The paper particularly focused on the Al Fakhouri pottery which used a rare technique not used elsewhere in Lebanon. This involved combining thrown and coil construction in the same pot. The resulting pots could be very large and were used for storing olives, rice, oil, arak and conserves. The clay was dug from pits at the west end of the village and from a site 2km away. It was settled during the winter in irrigated terraced beds. The manufacturing season was from May to September. The kiln was built into the hillside and was 5 metres tall; containing up to 1,500 pots at a time and consuming 7,000 kilos of wood, the firings took eight days.

== Bibliography ==
- Bakhit, Muhammad Adnan Salamah (February 1972). The Ottoman Province of Damascus in the Sixteenth Century (PhD). School of Oriental and African Studies, University of London.
