= Jal el Dib =

Jal El Dib جل الدّيب
- Location within Lebanon
- Coordinates: 33°54′32.0″N 35°34′54.8″E
- Country: Lebanon
- Governorate: Mount Lebanon Governorate
- District: Matn District

Jal El Dib or Jal Ed Dib (Arabic: جل الدّيب) is a Lebanese city in the kaza of Matn in the Mount Lebanon Governorate 11 kilometers north of the capital city of Beirut. Its inhabitants are almost predominantly Maronite Catholic.

== History ==
Jal el Dib was originally a small village that grew in population and importance as a result of its strategic location. During the Ottoman Empire era, the town was a major stopping point for caravans traveling along the Beirut-Tripoli road. With the arrival of the French mandate in the early 20th century, the town continued to flourish and became an important commercial center.

== Culture and attractions ==
Jal el Dib is a diverse and multicultural town, with residents from various religious and ethnic backgrounds. The town is home to several places of worship, including churches, mosques, and a synagogue. There are also numerous restaurants and cafes, offering a wide variety of Lebanese and international cuisine.

One of the most notable attractions in Jal el Dib is the Saint Joseph University Campus, which is located in the town's southern outskirts. The campus is home to several faculties and institutes, including the Faculty of Engineering, the Institute of History, and the Institute of Political Science.

Another popular attraction in Jal el Dib is the Jal el Dib Bridge, which spans the Nahr el Kalb river. The bridge is a historic site, with inscriptions dating back to ancient times.

== Transportation ==
Jal el Dib is well-connected to other parts of Lebanon via the Beirut-Tripoli highway, which runs through the town. The town is also served by several local buses and taxis, providing easy access to neighboring areas.
