= Matn District =

Coordinates: 33.8967°N 35.5778°E

- District
- قضاء المتن
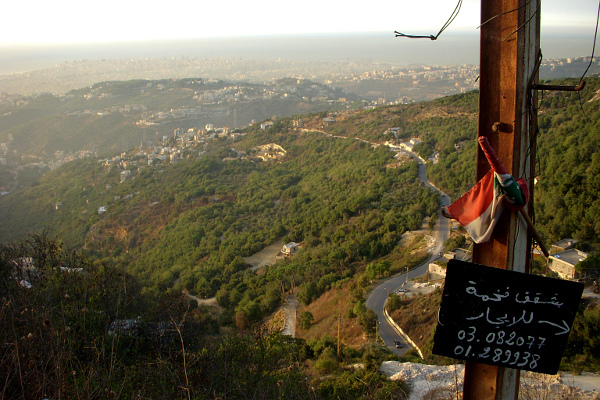
- Matn hills overlooking Beirut in 2018

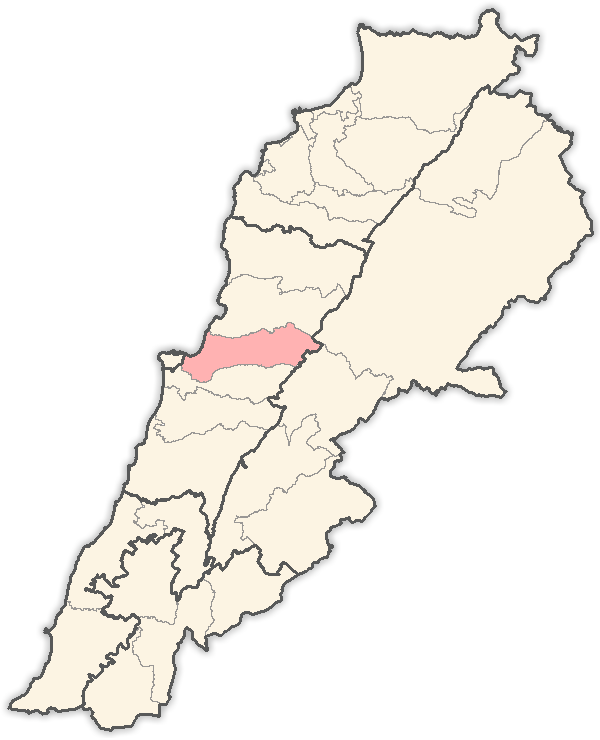
- Location in Lebanon
- Country: Lebanon
- Governorate: Mount Lebanon
- Capital: Jdeideh

Area
  - Total: 102 sq mi (265 km^{2})

Population
  - Estimate (31 December 2025): 523,593
- Time zone: UTC+2 (EET)
  - Summer (DST): UTC+3 (EEST)

Matn (Arabic: قضاء المتن, romanized: Qaḍāʾ al-Matn, sometimes spelled Metn (or preceded by the article El, as in El Matn), is a district (qadaa) in the Mount Lebanon Governorate of Lebanon, east of the Lebanon's capital Beirut. The district capital is Jdeideh.

Matn is one of the most popular areas in Lebanon, with its rich scenery and its splendid view of the Mediterranean. Matn's population is almost entirely Christian, with some Druze in the region, mostly in Beit Mery, Brummana, Mtein and Zarooun.

The Matn district is also popularly known as Northern Matn District (قضاء المتن الشمالي, Qaḍāʾ al-Matn aš-Šamāliyy), not to be confused with Southern Matn (المتن الجنوبي, al-Matn al-Janūbī) or Uppermost Matn (المتن الأعلى, al-Matn al-ʾAʿlā), both parts of Baabda District.

== Popular cities ==
City	Population
Jdeideh*	18,000
Bourj Hammoud*	45,000
Bouchrieh*	25,000
Antelias*	9,500
Brummana*	4,800
Baabdat*	3,600
El Mansouria*	17,000
Bhersaf*	1,810
Bikfaya*	8,200
Beit Chabab*	8,700
Beit Mery*	5,600
Chewyeh*	500
Jal el Dib*	5,400
Dekwaneh*	6,450
Zalka*	4,000
Sin el Fil*	16,000
Dbayeh*	4,900
Kornet Chehwan*	4,800
Aintoura	5,100
Choueir	6,370
Khenchara	4,200
Bteghrine	4,500
Baskinta	11,000
Kaakour	1,801
Fanar	15,000

Note: starred cities are part of metropolitan Beirut.

== Demographics ==
From voter registration data:

Year	Christians						Muslims			Druze
Year	Total	Maronites	Greek Orthodox	Armenian Orthodox	Greek Catholics	Other Christians	Total	Shias	Sunnis	Druze
2014	93.23%	43.68%	14.70%	14.57%	9.93%	10.35%	4.97%	2.84%	2.02%	1.31%
2018	93.44%	43.78%	14.71%	14.19%	9.99%	10.77%	5.14%	3.02%	2.12%	1.32%
2022	95.58%	45.03%	18.24%	12.99%	10.42%	8.90%	3.20%	2.20%	1.00%	1.22%
2026	93.00%	44.69%	14.82%	13.39%	10.00%	10.10%	5.58%	3.30%	2.28%	1.42%

Number of registered voters (21+ years old) over the years.

Years	Women	Men	Total	Growth (%)
2009	87,530	83,175	170,705	—N/a
2010	87,893 ▲	83,354 ▲	171,247 ▲	+0.32% ▲
2011	87,655 ▼	83,275 ▼	170,930 ▼	-0.19% ▼
2012	88,011 ▲	83,606 ▲	171,617 ▲	+0.40% ▲
2013	89,197 ▲	84,136 ▲	173,333 ▲	+0.99% ▲
2014	89,825 ▲	84,809 ▲	174,634 ▲	+0.74% ▼
2015	90,619 ▲	85,180 ▲	175,799 ▲	+0.66% ▼
2016	91,080 ▲	86,067 ▲	177,147 ▲	+0.76% ▲
2017	91,751 ▲	86,514 ▲	178,265 ▲	+0.63% ▼
2018	92,730 ▲	87,189 ▲	179,919 ▲	+0.92% ▲
2019	93,415 ▲	87,742 ▲	181,157 ▲	+0.68% ▼
2020	93,983 ▲	88,264 ▲	182,247 ▲	+0.60% ▼
2021	94,194 ▲	88,445 ▲	182,639 ▲	+0.21% ▼
2022	94,606 ▲	88,835 ▲	183,441 ▲	+0.44% ▲
2023	94,499 ▼	88,634 ▼	183,133 ▼	-0.17% ▼
2024	94,779 ▲	88,752 ▲	183,531 ▲	+0.22% ▲
2025	94,873 ▲	88,901 ▲	183,774 ▲	+0.13% ▼
2026	—N/a	—N/a	184,281 ▲	+0.28% ▲
Source: DGCS

== Municipalities ==
Municipality	Arabic name	Area (km²)	Pop.
Bsalim - Mezher - Majzoub	بصاليم - مزهر - المجذوب		
Mazraat Yachouh	مزرعة يشوع		
Wadi el Karem	وادي الكرم		
Ain el Safssaf - Mar Michael Bnabil	عين الصفصاف - مار مخايل بنابيل		
Mar Chaaya & Mzekkeh	مار شعيا والمزكة		
Ghabeh	الغابة		
Majdel Tarchich	مجدل ترشيش		
Fanar	الفنار		
Beit Chabab - Chaouiyeh & Qnaitra	بيت شباب - الشاوية والقنيطرة		
Qonnabat Broummana	قنابة برمانا		
Dahr el Sawan	ضهر الصوان		
Mtein & Mchikha	المتين ومشيخا		
Jal el Dib - Bqenneya	جل الديب - بقنايا		
Antelias - Naccache	انطلياس - النقاش		
Biakout	بياقوت		
Bikfaya - Mhaydseh, Matn	بكفيا - المحيدثة		
Baskinta	بسكنتا		
Bteghrine	بتغرين		
Dbayeh - Zouk al Khrab - Haret al Ballaneh - Aoukar	الضبية - ذوق الخراب - حارة البلانة - عوكر		
Dhour El Choueir - Ain el Sendianeh	ضهور الشوير - عين السنديانة		
Douar	الدوار		
Dik El Mehdi	ديك المحدي		
Ouyoun	العيون		
Kafarakab	كفرعقاب		
Ain Saadeh - Beit Mery	بيت مري - عين سعادة		
Baabdat	بعبدات		
Jdeideh - Bauchrieh - Sed el Bauchrieh	الجديدة - البوشرية - السد		
Mrouj	المروج		
Aintoura	عينطورة		
Kaakour	القعقور		
Kfertay	كفرتيه		
Ghabet Bologna - Wata el Mrouj	غابة بولونيا - وطى المروج		
Ayroun	عيرون		
Sin el Fil	سن الفيل		
Brummana	برمانا		
Zakrit	زكريت		
Mansourieh - Mkalles - Daychounieh	المنصورية - المكلس - الديشونية		
Cornet Chahwan - Ain Aar - Beit El Kikko & Hbous	قرنة شهوان - عين عار - بيت الككو والحبوس		
Zarooun	زرعون		
Sakiyat al Mesek - Bhersaf	ساقية المسك - بحرصاف		
Mar Moussa - Douar	مار موسى - الدوار		
Khenchara & Jouar	الخنشارة والجوار		
Bourj Hammoud - Dora	برج حمود - الدورة		
Zalka - Amaret Chalhoub	الزلقا - عمارة شلهوب		
Nabay	نابيه		
Marjaba	مرجبا		
Rabieh	الرابية		
Biyada	البياضة		
Mtaileb	مطيلب		
Beit el Chaar & Hadirah	بيت الشعار والحضيرة		
Roumieh	رومية		
Dekwaneh - Mar Roukouz - Daher al Hosein	الدكوانة - مار روكز - ضهر الحصين		
Jouret el ballout	جورة البلوط		

== Gallery ==
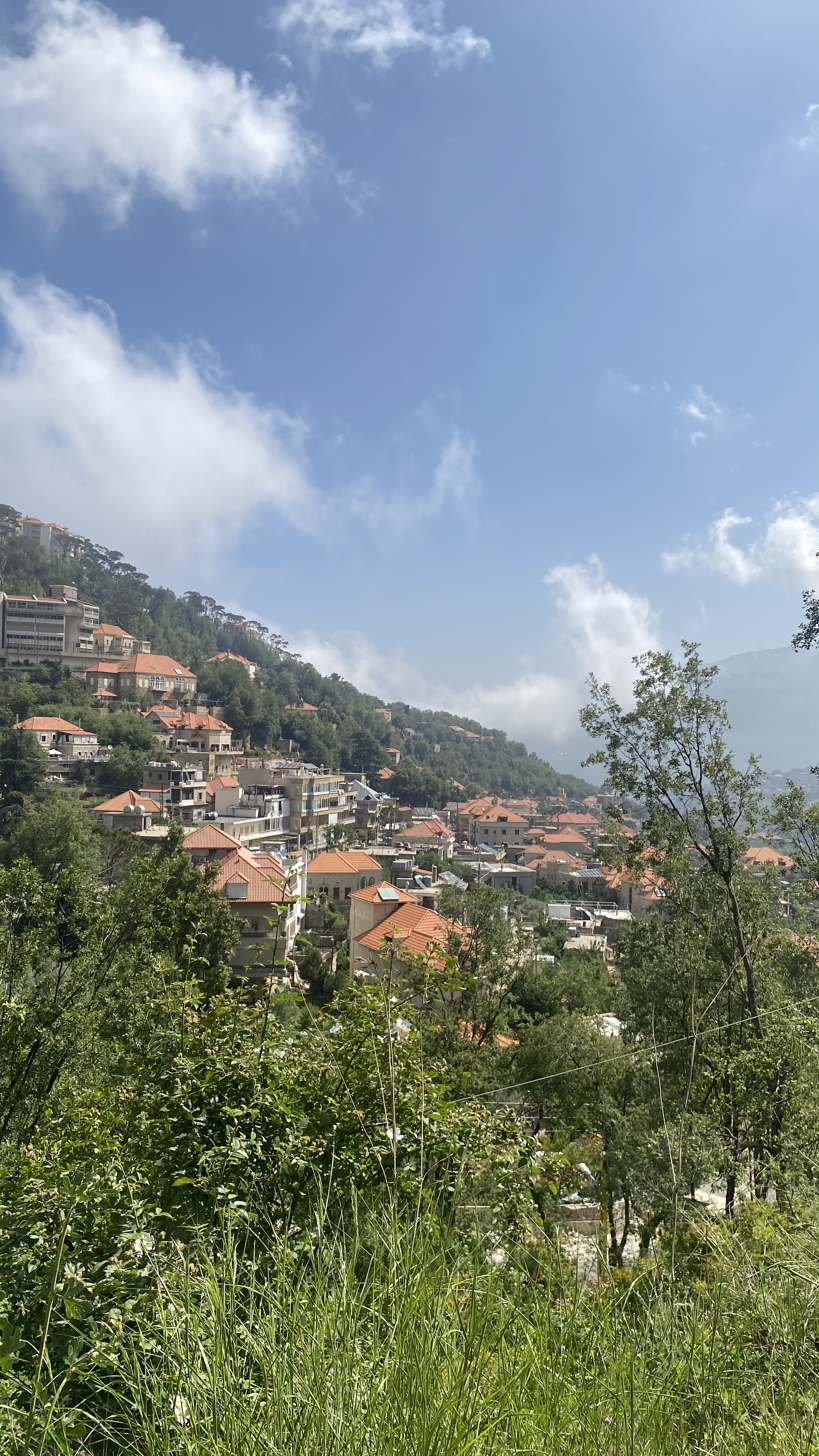
Dhour Choueir in 2023

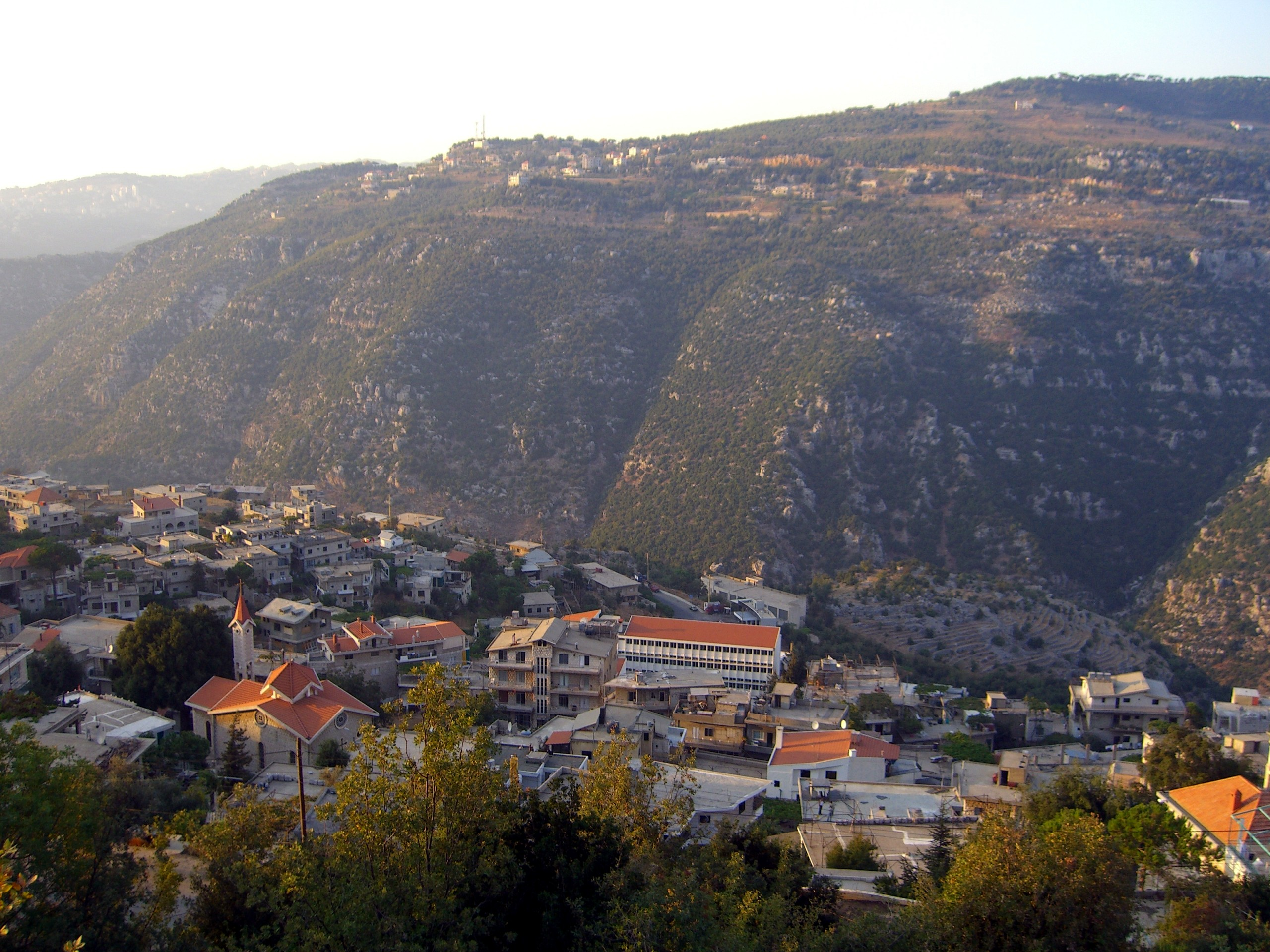
Bteghrine in 2005

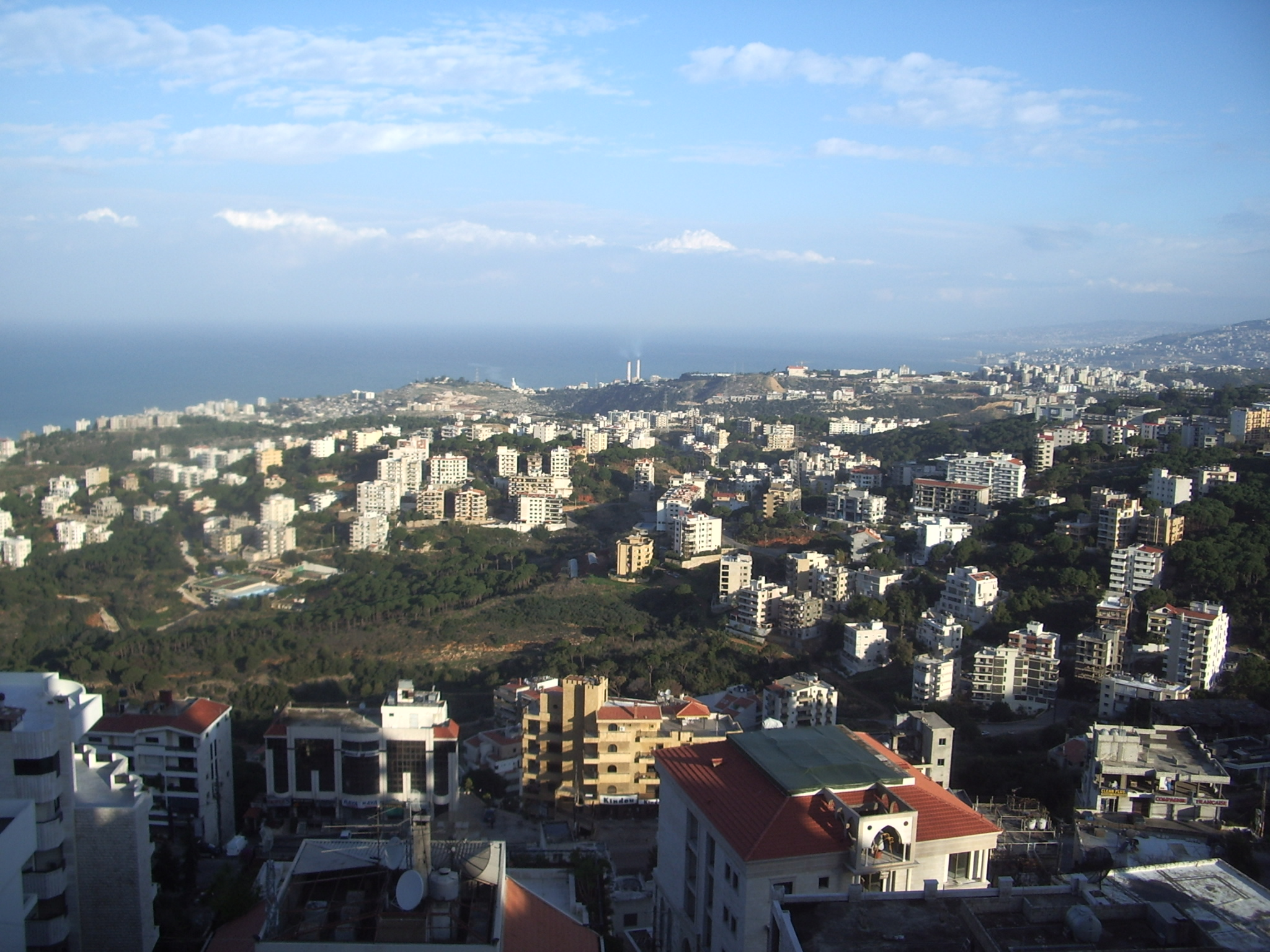
Rabieh in 2005

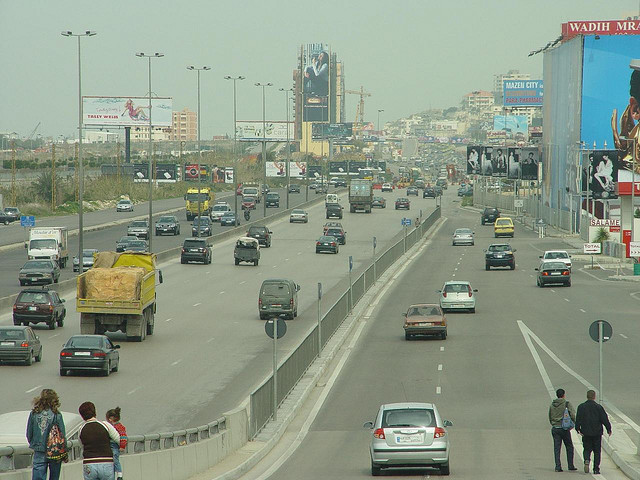
Metn coastal highway at Dbayeh in 2008
