= Mount Lebanon Governorate =

Governorate of Lebanon

Mount Lebanon Governorate Arabic: محافظة جبل لبنان
- The governorates of Lebanon, including Mount Lebanon (in pink, labelled 6)
- Coordinates: 33°50′N 35°32′E
- Country: Lebanon
- Capital: Baabda

Government
  - Governor: Charbel Tabet (Independent)

Area
  - Total: 1,238 km^{2} (478 sq mi)

Population (31 December 2017)
  - Total: 1,520,016
  - Density: 1,228/km^{2} (3,180/sq mi)
- Time zone: UTC+2 (EET)
  - Summer (DST): UTC+3 (EEST)
- ISO 3166 code: LB-JL

Mount Lebanon Governorate (Arabic: محافظة جبل لبنان, romanized: Muḥāfaẓat Jabal Lubnān) is one of the nine governorates of Lebanon, of which it is the most populous. Its capital is Baabda. Other notable towns and cities include Aley, Bikfaya, and Beit Mery.

This governorate is named after the mountainous region of Mount Lebanon and, except for the small Beirut Governorate which it surrounds, spans the stretch of the Mediterranean coast between Keserwan-Jbeil Governorate and South Governorate.

== Geography ==
The Governorate of Mount Lebanon (except the area around Beirut) extends along the coast of the Mediterranean Sea. To the north, it borders the Keserwan-Jbeil Governorate, and it borders the Southern Governorate to the south. On the eastern side, it borders the governorates of Bekaa and Baalbek-Hermel.

The governorate's altitude ranges from zero to 3,000 meters above sea level. It has diverse geographical features, including urban areas, mixed rural areas and natural areas. It is crossed by 5 rivers (Nahr El Kalb, Nahr Beirut, Damour, Awali River and Nahr Ibrahim) and includes the Shabrouh Dam with a capacity of 8 million cubic meters of water.

== Districts ==
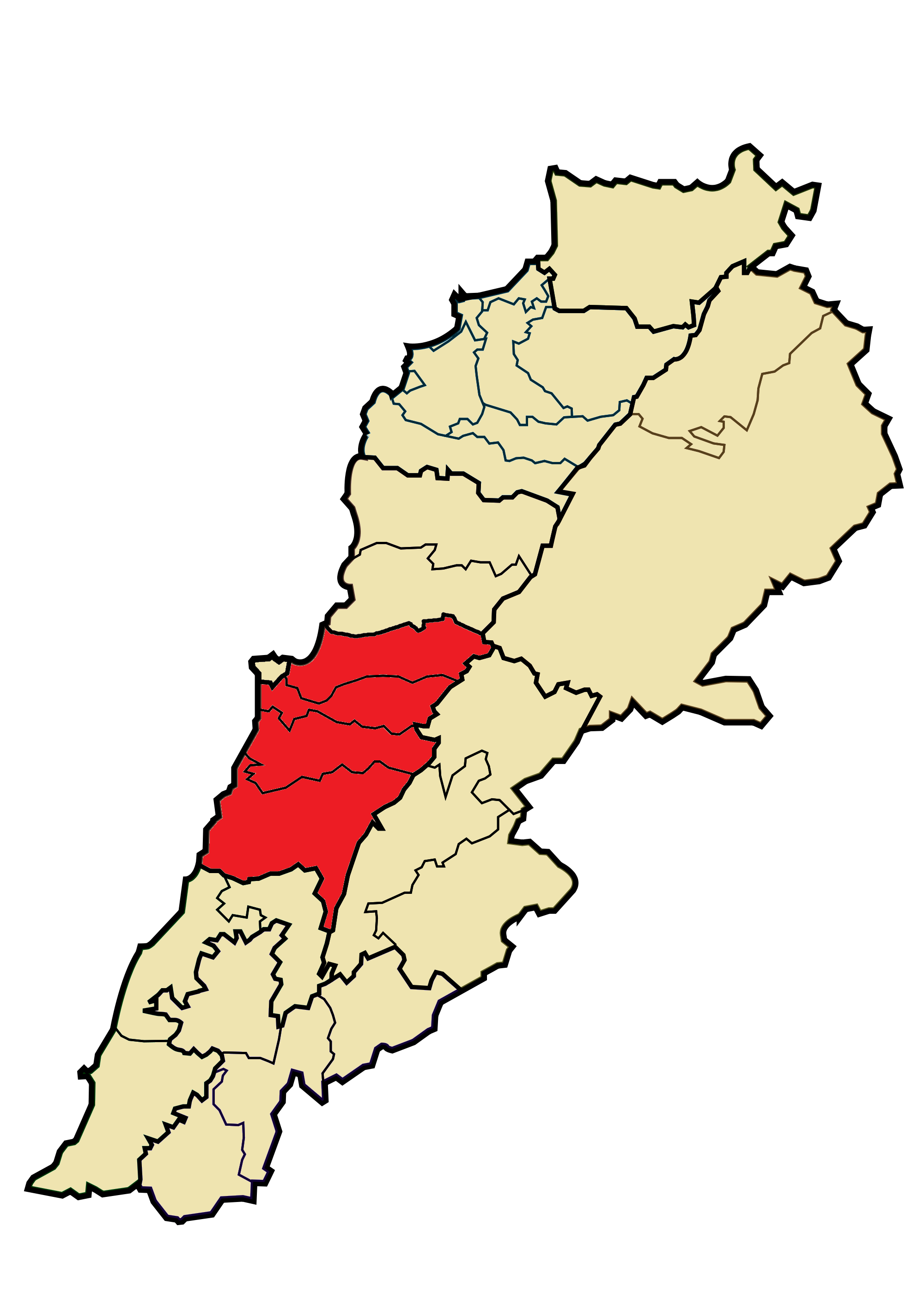
Districts of the Mount Lebanon Governorate

The governorate is divided into four districts (aqḍiyah, singular qaḍāʼ):

District	Arabic name	Capital
Aley	قضاء عاليه	Aley
Baabda	قضاء بعبدا	Baabda
Chouf	قضاء الشوف	Beiteddine
Matn	قضاء المتن	Jdeideh

The districts of Jbeil and Keserwan were part of Mount Lebanon Governorate until 7 September 2017, when they were separated to form Keserwan-Jbeil Governorate.

== Demographics ==
According to registered voters in 2014:

Religion in Mount Lebanon Governorate
1. Christianity (56.6%)
2. Druze (23.9%)
3. Sunni Islam (10.9%)
4. Shia Islam (8.14%)
5. Other (0.49%)
Religion in Mount Lebanon Governorate including Keserwan-Jbeil Governorate
1. Christianity (63.0%)
2. Druze (18.9%)
3. Sunni Islam (9.06%)
4. Shia Islam (8.55%)
5. Other (0.51%)

Year	Christians						Muslims				Druze
Year	Total	Maronites	Greek Orthodox	Greek Catholics	Armenian Orthodox	Other Christians	Total	Sunnis	Shias	Alawites	Druze
2014	56.56%	32.88%	8.58%	6.64%	4.34%	4.12%	19.12%	10.95%	8.14%	0.03%	23.86%

Mount Lebanon has a Christian majority with the presence of other religious groups such as Druze and Muslims. Maronites live in the Metn and Baabda districts (other Christian denominations such as Greek Orthodox, Armenian Orthodox, and Greek Catholics make up the rest of the population alongside Muslims). The Druze are the majority in the Aley district and a plurality in the Chouf district (nearly equal in numbers with Sunni Muslims and Christians). Shia minorities live in the Coast areas of Baabda District like Borj Al Barajneh, Haret Hreik, Ghobeiry and Chiyah.

There are no accurate statistics, but according to the number of registered voters in 2005, the percentage of Christians is 65.8%, followed by Druze with 15.43%, then Sunnis with 8.23%, followed by Shiites with 7.76%.

The Christian and Druze communities have a long history of interaction dating back roughly a millennium, particularly in Mount Lebanon. Over the centuries, they have peacefully interacted and lived together, sharing common social and cultural landscapes, although occasional exceptions have occurred. This interaction been marked by shared economic activities, cultural exchange, and even political alliances in some cases. The two communities lived among each other and interacted socially on an everyday basis. The close bonds between Christian and Druze neighbors led to Christian communities thriving in some Druze towns.

== Cities, towns and villages ==
This list includes all cities, towns and villages with more than 6,000 registered voters in 2014:

English name	Population	District
Bourj Hammoud	38,265	Matn District
Ghobeiry	21,251	Baabda District
Bourj el-Barajneh	16,327	Baabda District
Shheem	14,575	Chouf District
Baouchriye	14,018	Matn District
Barja	13,962	Chouf District
Aley	12,970	Aley District
Choueifat	12,632	Aley District
Haret Hreik	11,143	Baabda District
Hadath	10,018	Baabda District
Deir al-Qamar	9,601	Chouf District
Shiyyah	9,388	Baabda District
Damour	9,368	Chouf District
Sin el Fil	9,252	Matn District
Baakleen	7,630	Chouf District
Tahwitat el Nahr	7,203	Baabda District
Baskinta	6,585	Matn District

== Economy ==
The economy of Mount Lebanon Governorate depends mainly on industrial activities. The Governorate includes the highest percentage of industrial establishments in Lebanon (about 58% of the total Lebanese industrial establishments). The largest sector is the food industries sector (17.93%), thus representing 34% of the total number of companies engaged in food industries. This sector is followed by paper and printing companies, which constitute 13.15% of the industrial establishments in Mount Lebanon. There are more than 12 industrial zones in Mount Lebanon, near the port of Beirut.

The Governorate of Mount Lebanon includes five out of nine of Lebanon's top tourist attractions. It also includes 260 hotels, which is the highest percentage among the governorates, with the exception of Beirut.
