= Köprülü Library =

Library in Istanbul, Turkey

- Köprülü Kütüphanesi
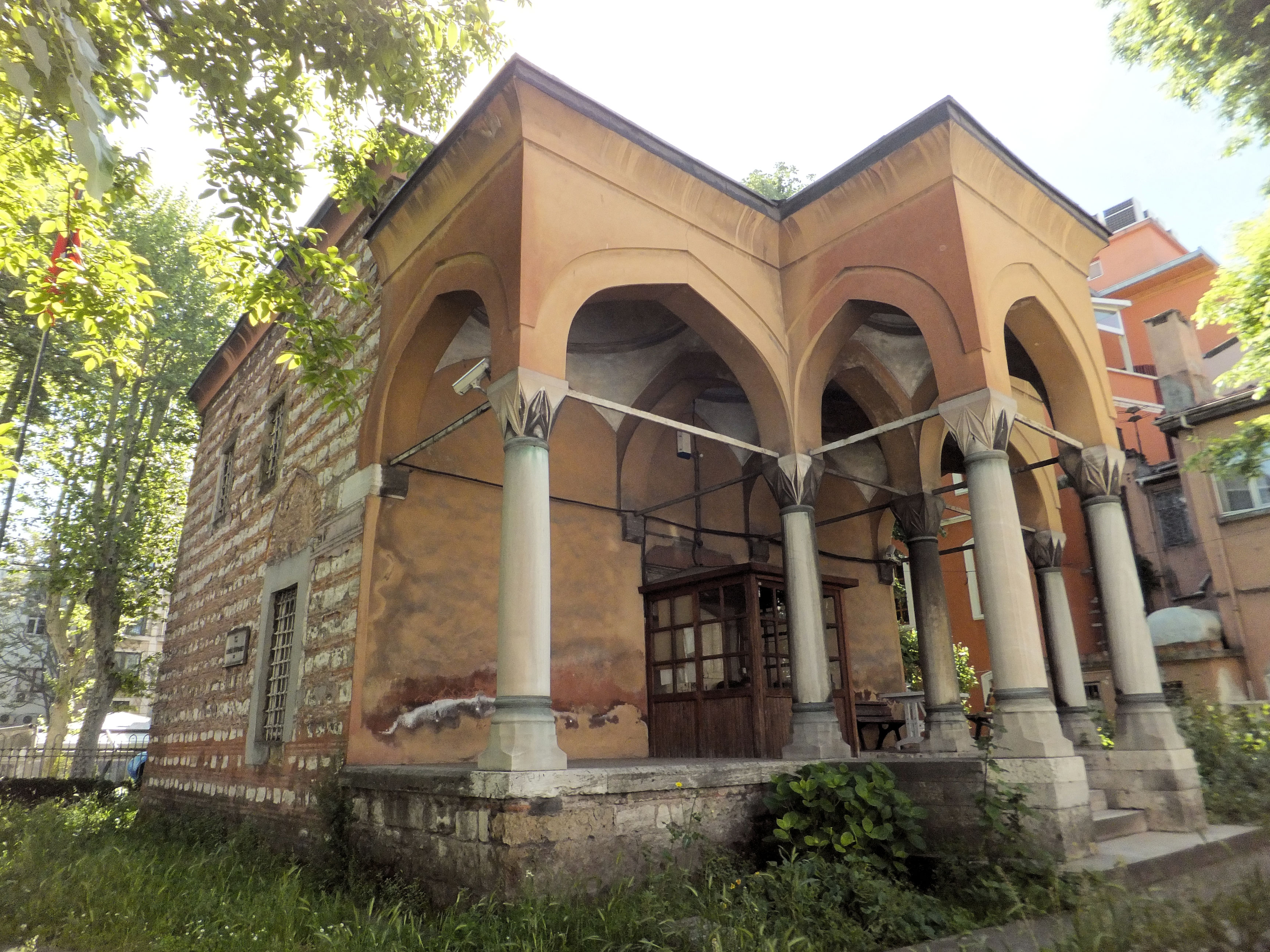
- 41°00′29″N 28°58′21″E
- Location: Istanbul, Turkey
- Established: 1678; 348 years ago

Collection
- Items collected: manuscripts
- Size: 3,790

Köprülü Library is a library in Istanbul. It was founded by Ottoman Grand Vizier Köprülü Mehmed Pasha in 1678. It was the first public library in the Middle East. The library currently contains 3,790 manuscript volumes.

== Foundation ==
Located along Divanyolu Street, Pierre Loti Street and Boyacı Ahmed Street, across from the tomb of Sultan Mahmut II in the Eminönü district of Istanbul, the Köprülü library was built by Köprülü Fazıl Ahmed Pasha, the son of sadrazam (grand vizier) Köprülü Mehmet Pasha, on the last wish of his father. Köprülüzade Fazıl Mustafa Pasha completed the establishment of the library at Çemberlitaş with the composition of a vakıf (non-for-profit organization) charter in 1678. The library was opened with its staff being composed of three librarians, one binder, and one janitor.

== Collection ==
The first book was donated by the Köprülü family, and the number of available books continued to increase with further donations and purchases. Of all the donations to the library, those by Köprülü Mehmet Pasha, Fazil Ahmet Pasa, Haci (Hafiz) Ahmet Pasha, and Mehmet Asim Bey were among the most substantial. Its collection contains 3,790 manuscripts in Turkish, Arabic and Persian as well as approximately 1,500 printed works. The catalogue of the Köprülü Library was prepared by Ramazan Şeşen, Cevat İzgi and Cemil Akpınar and was published in 1986. Köprülü library houses one of the most important Islamic manuscript collections in the world. The author, book, and subject lists of manuscripts and printed works are organized according to the Dewey Decimal Classification method.

== Architecture ==
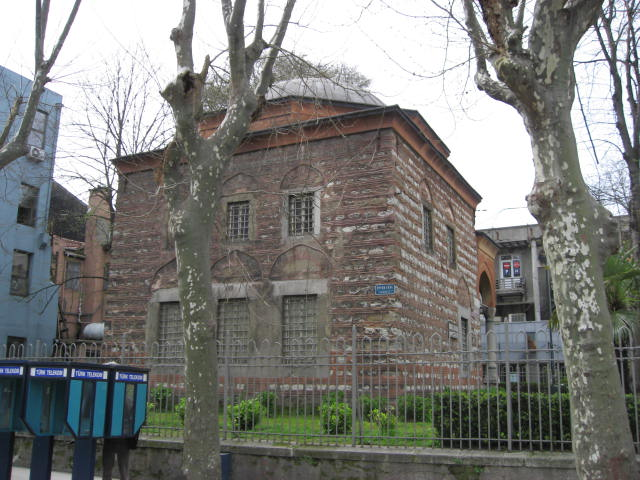
Back side of the library

The Köprülü Library was the first example of an independent library structure in Istanbul. It is located in a garden, whose three sides are surrounded by streets and is constructed with alternating stones and bricks. It is covered by a dome placed on an octagonal rim on the outside with a pendentive square plan. The arcade part, which is reached by a four-step staircase in the western section of the library, was moved to the front and has assumed a T-shape. There is a diamond-shaped head placed on top of six marble pillars, spire arch arcade is covered with four domes. The library is accessed through a low-pitched door in the central axis of the arcade.

The interior is illuminated by windows, with one on each side, two in the upper level, and three each with six upper part windows across the entrance. There are spire discharge arches with rectangular jambs. The interior surface of the dome and pendentives are decorated with over-the-gate pen works. Both "C" and "S" curves attract visitors’ attention among these brown, black and red ornamentations. Written underneath the flower designs are the word, "Maşallah," and date, 1181 Hijri (1667-1668). Furthermore, both "Masallah" and the date of 1289 Hijri (1872) and 1327 Hijri (1911) are written on the inner door. Based on these inscriptions, it is understood that the library underwent restoration in both 1872 and 1911.

== See also ==
- List of libraries in Istanbul
