= Btekhnay =

Btekhnay بتخنيه Btekhnai
- Location in Lebanon
- Coordinates: 33°50′30″N 35°43′10″E
- Country: Lebanon
- Governorate: Mount Lebanon
- District: Baabda

Area
  - Total: 263 ha (650 acres)
- Elevation: 1,000 m (3,300 ft)

Btekhnay (Arabic: بتخنيه; also spelled Btekhnai) is a municipality in the Baabda District of Mount Lebanon Governorate, Lebanon. It is located 42 kilometers east of Beirut. There is one public school in the village with 400 students as of 2016. Ten companies with over fifteen employees operate in the village. The villagers profess the Druze faith.

== Geography ==
Btekhnay has a total land area of 263 hectares. Its average elevation is 1,000 meters above sea level. Neighboring municipalities include Qarnayel to the north, Deir al-Harf and Btebiat to the west, Bmariam to the south, and el-Qalaa to the east. It is located in the Mount Lebanon Governorate. It has a strategic place in Lebanon; it is close to the Bekaa Valley, Beirut, Bikfaya, and the Chouf.

== History ==
Btekhnay is known to have a lot of history. The village was established by the Abulhosn family and has a population of around 2,000 people. Btekhnay has experienced a relatively prosperous and peaceful history. During the 1960s and early 1970s Beirutis and Arabs used to come to Btekhnay and rent places to stay in the summer because of the cool weather and picturesque landscape around the village. Later In the decade during the Lebanese Civil War it was regarded as one of the safest villages in the region. Nevertheless Btekhnay has many buildings and monuments such as the Btekhnay Clock Tower, The Martyrs Square, The Town Hall (Khaliye), the General Medical Center (mestawsef), the Miqam and Khalwe. Furthermore, Btekhany established one of the first schools in its district During the late 1940s the Btekhany Public School accompanied with the a Fiba sized Basketball court which was later built in the century. Btekhnay has a rich source of underground water and water coming from the mountains surrounding it. There are two wells where natural drinkable water flows and where many villagers get their water from. It is inhabited by Druze people.
