= Ahmed Köprülü Pasha =

Ahmed Köprülü Pasha (Ottoman Turkish: احمد کوپروغلی پاشا), in contemporary sources Ahmet Coprogli Pasha, was a high-ranked official in the court of Ottoman Sultan Abdülmecid I who held a variety of offices.

While serving as ambassador to Russia in February 1834, Pacha presented Czar Nicholas with a number of gifts, including a bridle/saddle/caparison worth an estimated £50,000, bracelets, 150 cashmere shawls, a dozen Arabian horses, and the chief gift, a jewel-encrusted sword said to have been taken from Constantine XI's corpse, following Mehmet II's Fall of Constantinople.

By 1854, Pacha was Commander of the Ottoman naval forces in the Crimean War, where he met with Vice-Admirals James Dundas and François Hamelin to discuss the possibility of Ottoman participation in the attack on Mykolaiv naval base.

While serving as Commander in Chief and Governor-General, Pacha was allegedly told about the ongoing 1860 Damascus massacre, but failed to mobilise his 800 troops to intervene.
