= Jdeideh, Chouf =

Jdeideh الجديدة Jdaidet al-Chouf
- Location in Lebanon
- Coordinates: 33°39′46″N 35°36′24″E
- Country: Lebanon
- Governorate: Mount Lebanon
- District: Chouf

Jdeideh (Arabic: الجديدة, romanized: al-Jdaydeh) is a Lebanese village in the Chouf District of the Mount Lebanon Governorate in Lebanon. It is known for its traditional architecture and role in regional trade. Its inhabitants are predominantly Druze.
