= Bmaryam =

Bmariam بمريم
- Location within Lebanon
- Coordinates: 33°49′43″N 35°43′25″E
- Country: Lebanon
- Governorate: Mount Lebanon
- District: Baabda District

Bmariam, also spelled Bmaryam, is a village in Baabda District, Mount Lebanon Governorate, Lebanon.

== History ==
During the Mountain War many of the Christians in the village fled due to fighting. On 1 September 1983, Druze militias entered the Syrian-controlled village and killed 39 of Christian civilians. The right-wing Phalangist-operated Voice of Lebanon radio station reported that the militias had "butchered about 40 elderly persons and children with knives, including the town’s priest, Gergis El-Rai," and that only one remaining Christian had survived.
