= Jan-Baptist Huysmans =

Belgian painter

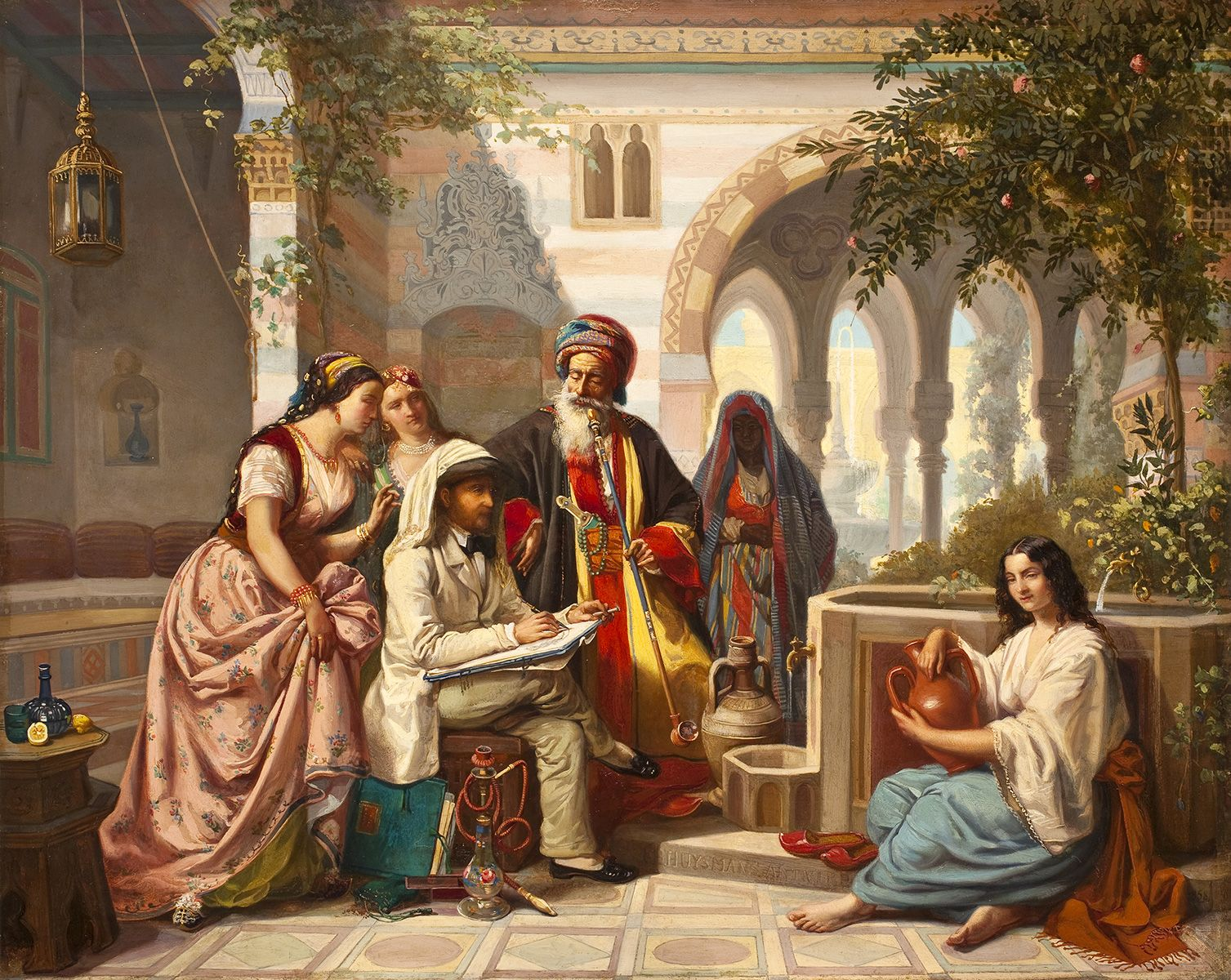
- The artist sketching in a courtyard in Damascus, by Jan-Baptist Huysmans
- Born: 25 April 1826, Antwerp
- Died: May 1906, Hove, Belgium
- Education: Royal Academy of Fine Arts (1843-1849)
- Known for: Orientalist paintings

Jan-Baptist Huysmans or Jean Baptiste Huysmans (French pronunciation: [ʒanbatist ɥijsmã]; 25 April 1826 in Antwerp – May 1906 in Hove, Belgium), was a Belgian painter known for his Orientalist scenes. He led a peripatetic life style and travelled and worked in many countries.

== Life ==
Jan Baptist Huysmans was born in Antwerp. He studied at the Royal Academy of Fine Arts (Koninklijke Academie voor Schone Kunsten) in Antwerp from 1843 to 1849. Starting from 1856, he travelled widely and visited Greece, Turkey, Syria, Palestine, Egypt and Algeria. He was clearly fascinated and sensitive to the intricacies of local costume, accessory, and custom as is shown in his sketchbooks, studies, paintings and written accounts of these travels.

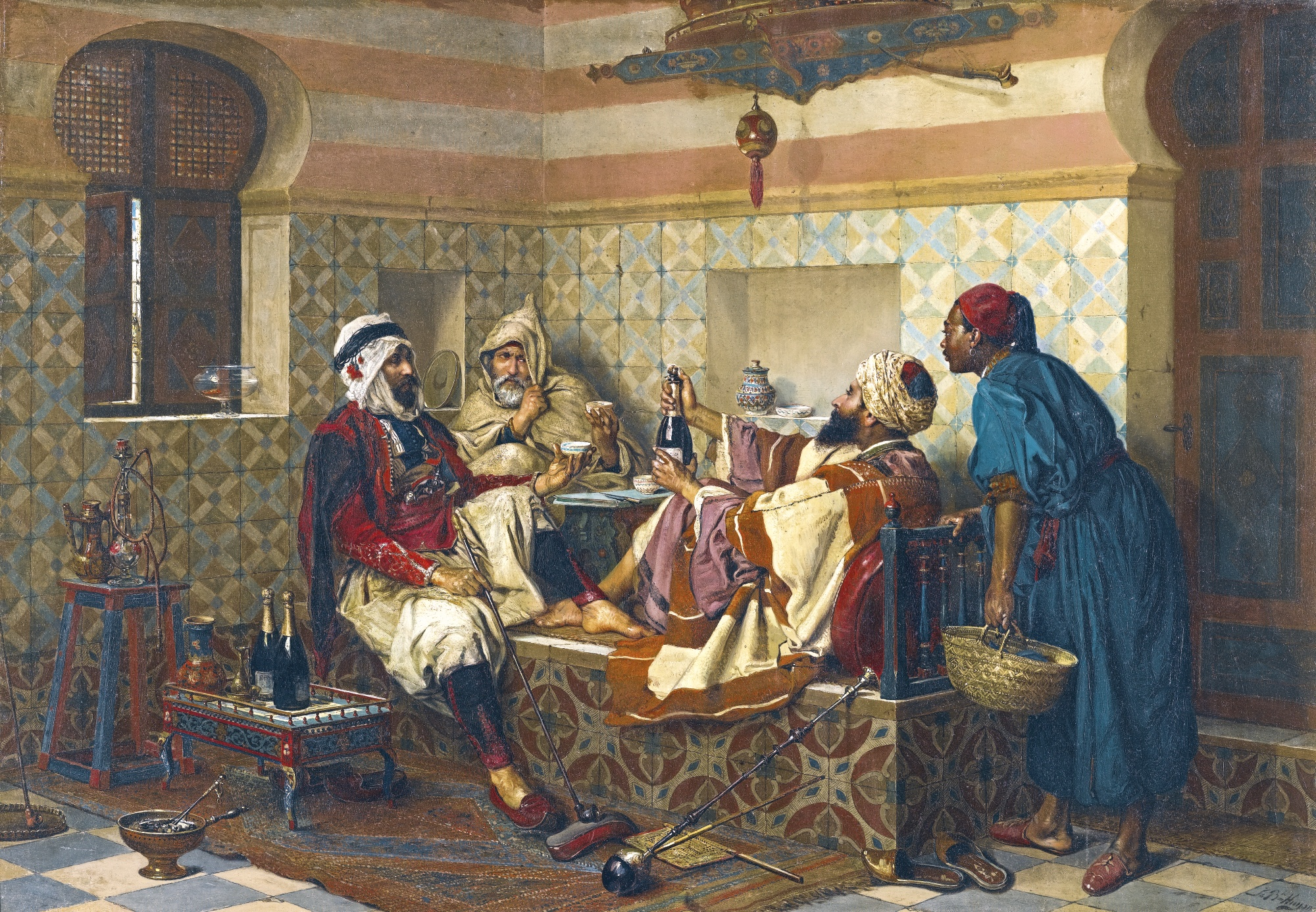
A celebration

He spent 30 years in Paris before returning to live in his native city of Antwerp. He settled later with his wife Maria-Catherina in Hove, Belgium where he died in 1906.

He exhibited in Antwerp in 1853, at the Royal Glasgow Institute of the Fine Arts and the Manchester Art Gallery from 1863 to 1891, and at the Salon des Artistes Français in Paris in 1889 for the Exposition Universelle.

== Work ==
Huysmans is now mainly known for his Orientalist compositions. During his lifetime he also produced vast religious compositions for churches in Jerusalem as well as decorative panels in the church and municipal buildings of the Belgian cities Gheel and Comines.

Huysmans' Orientalist paintings were clearly influenced by Orientalism's greatest master Gérôme. He may also have been influenced by the popular British Orientalist painter John Frederick Lewis (1804–1876), whose "domesticated" Middle Eastern genre scenes were internationally praised. His Orientalist paintings represent simple, everyday scenes with strong colouring and well-observed details of costumes and objects.

He published his memoirs in illustrated works entitled Voyages en Italie et en Orient en 1856-1857. Notes et Impressions 1857 ('Travels in Italy and the Orient. Notes and Impressions 1857') in 1857 and Voyage illustré en Espagne & en Algérie, 1862 ('Illustrated travels in Spain and Algeria, 1862') in 1865.

== Gallery ==
Selected works

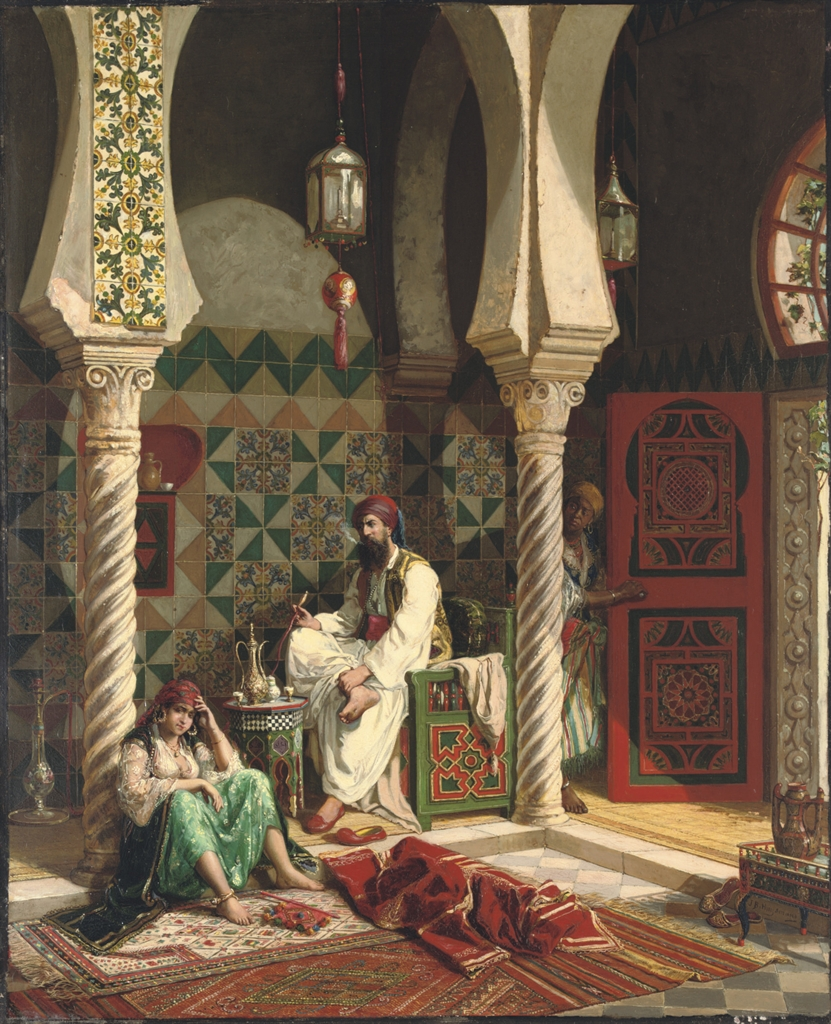
A plume of smoke

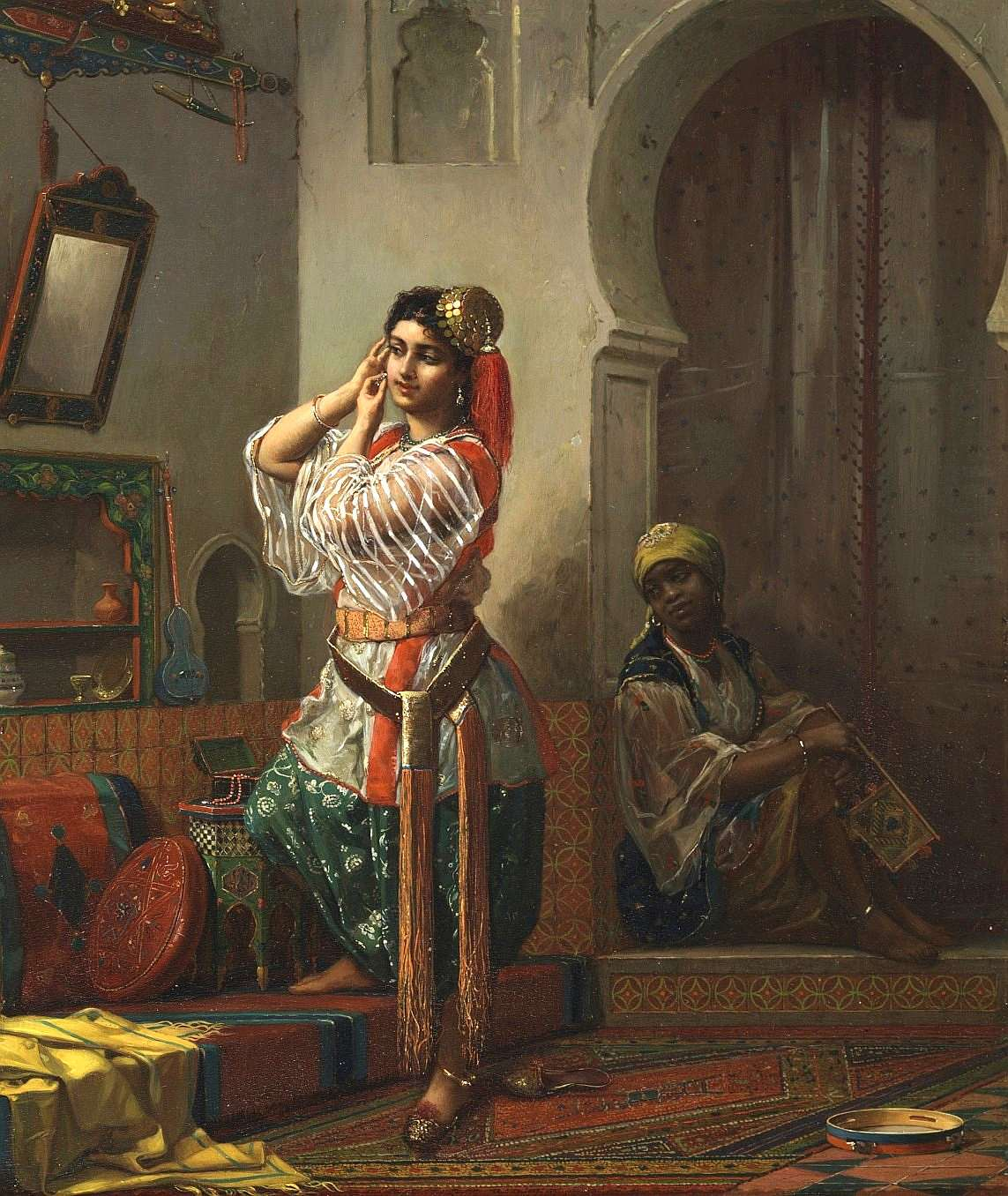
The Moorish Boudoir

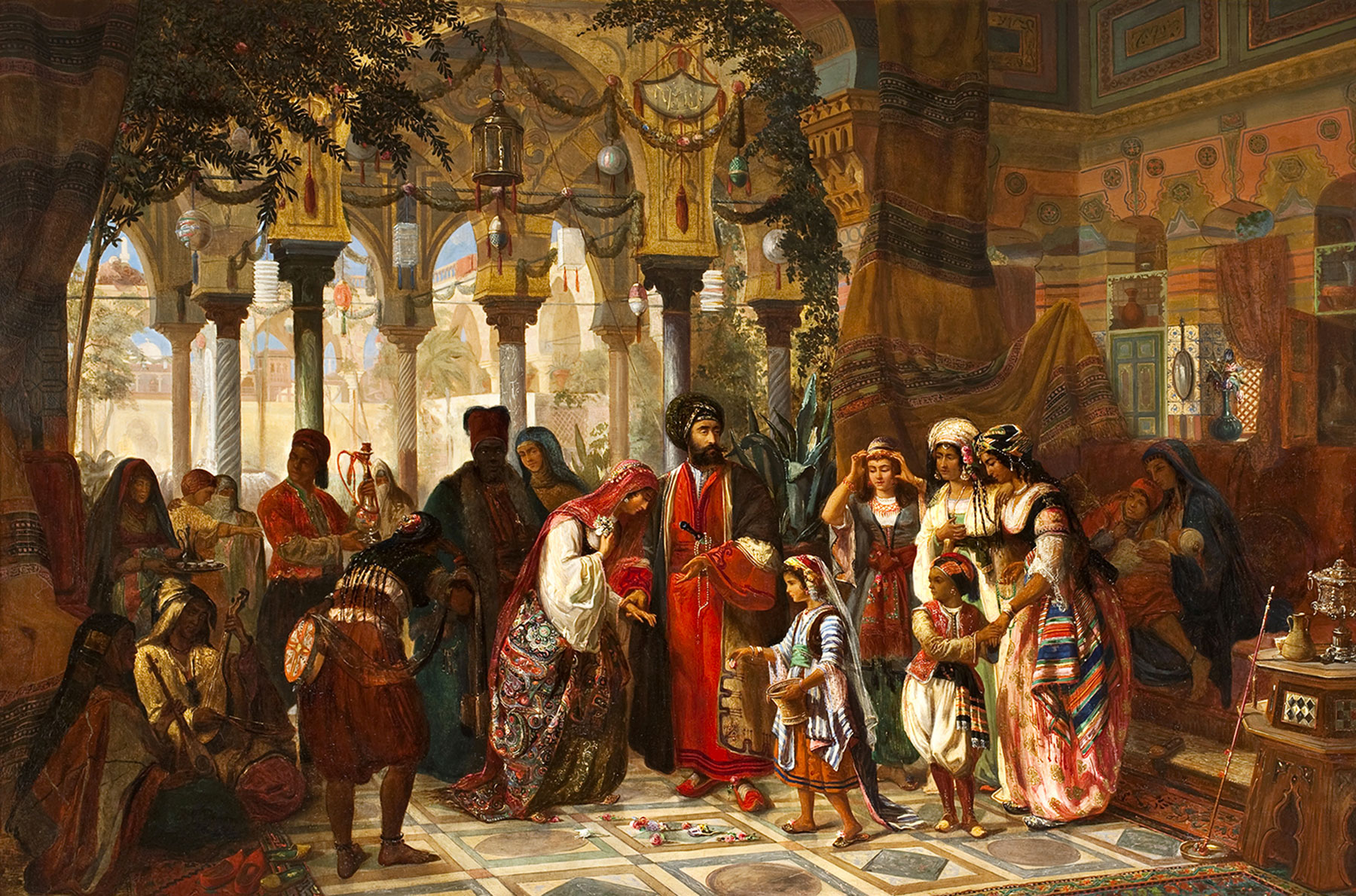
The presentation of the bride to the Court of Syria in Damascus

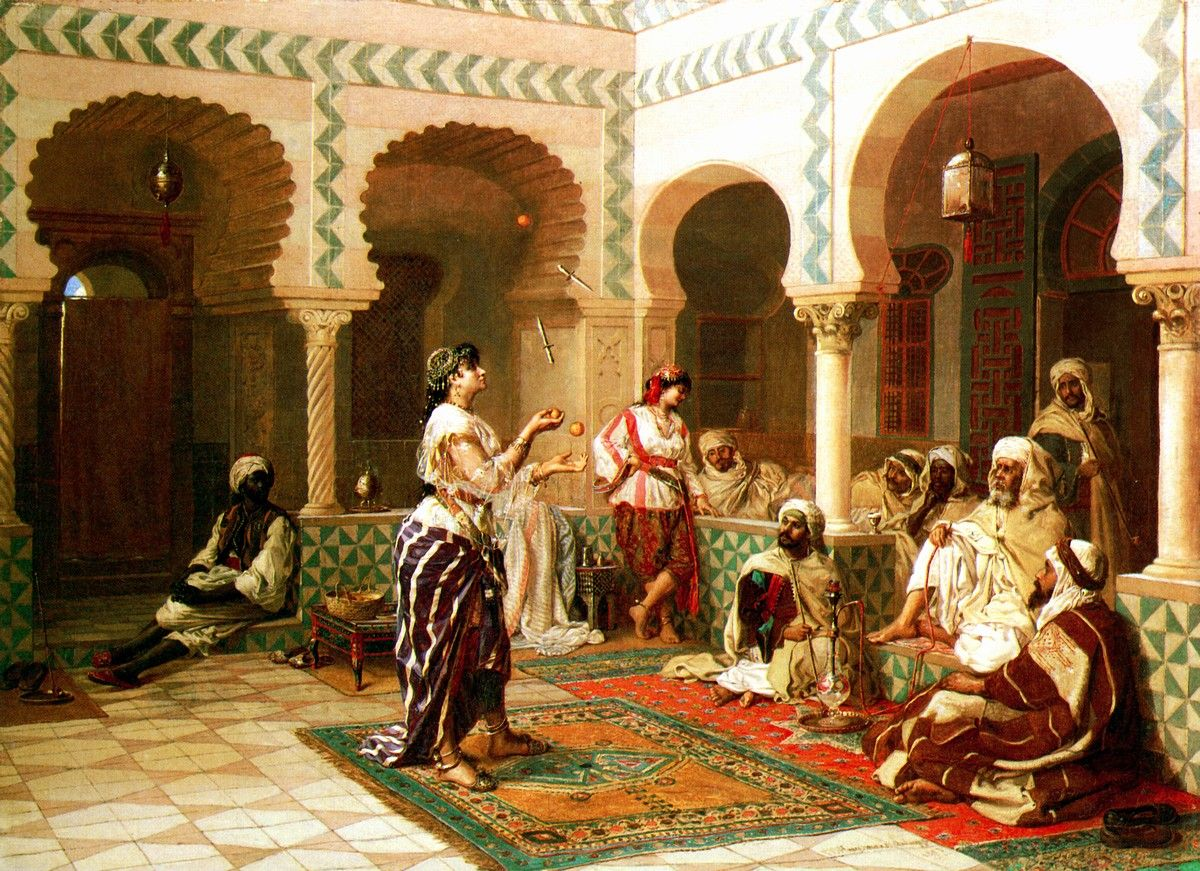
The juggler

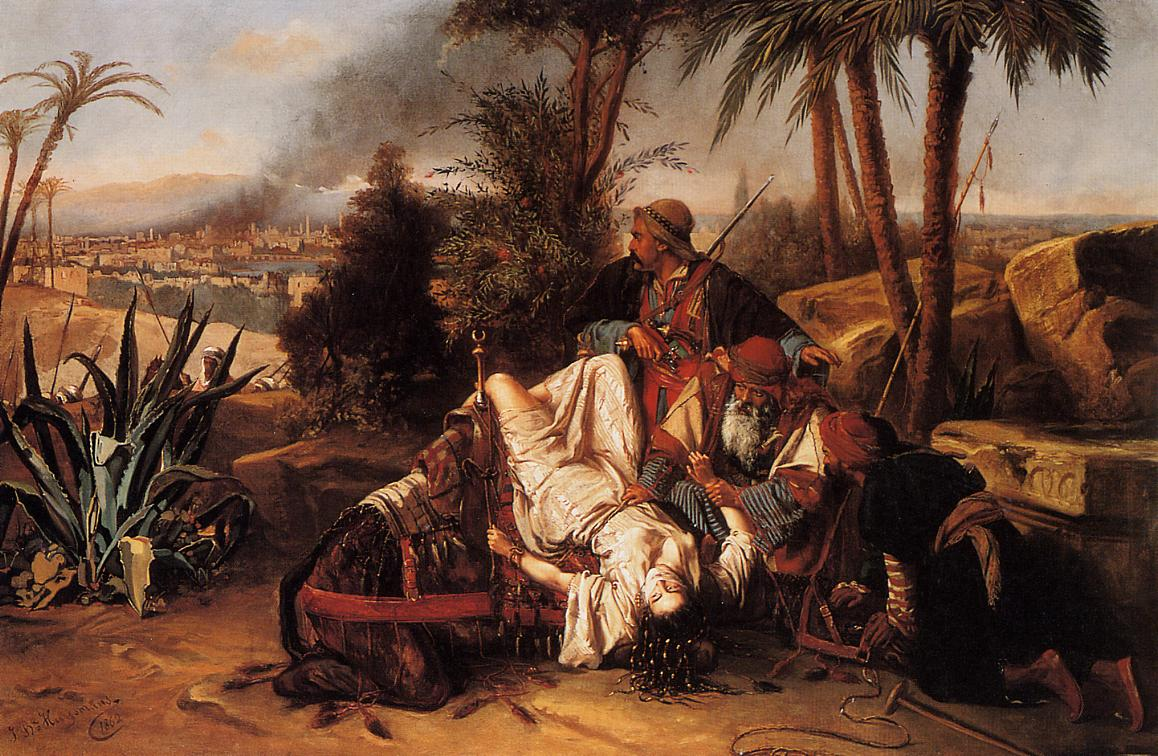
The captive

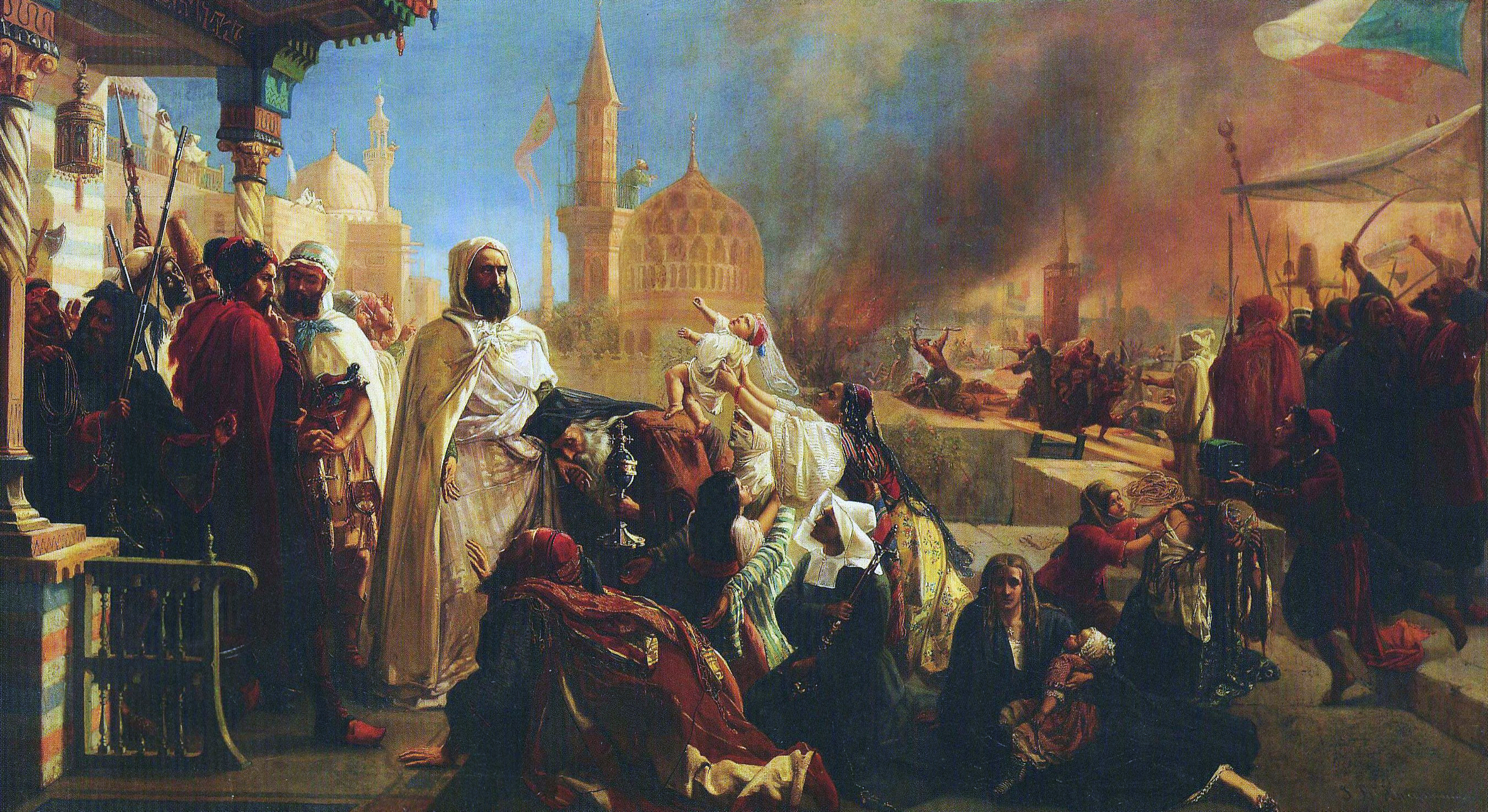
Emir Abd-el-Kader protects the Christians

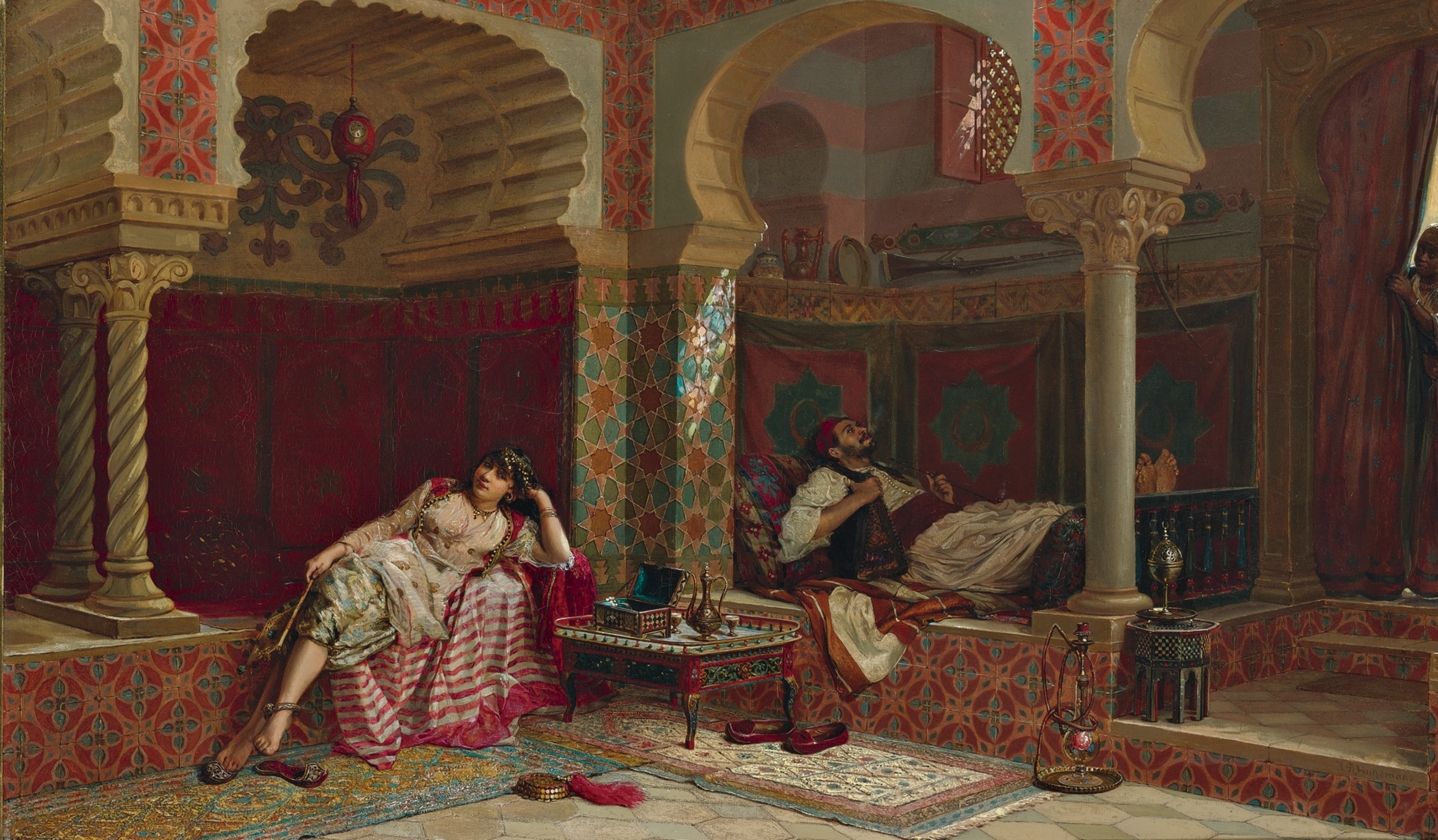
A private meeting

== See also ==
- List of Orientalist artists
- Orientalism
