= Beit Lahia, Lebanon =

Beit Lahia بيت لهيا
- Village
- Location in Lebanon
- Coordinates: 33°29′0″N 35°48′7″E
- Country: Lebanon
- Governorate: Beqaa Governorate
- District: Rashaya District

Beit Lahia (or Beit Lahya) (Arabic: بيت لهيا) is a village situated in the Rashaya District and south of the Beqaa Governorate in Lebanon. It is located near Mount Hermon and the Syrian border, not far from Rashaya, Aaiha and Kfar Qouq.

The village sits about 955 metres (3,133 ft) above sea level and comprises an area of 392 hectares (3.92 km^{2}).

== History ==
In 1838, Eli Smith noted Beit Lehya's population as being Druze, "Greek" Christians and Maronite.

== Bibliography ==
- Robinson, E.; Smith, E. (1841). Biblical Researches in Palestine, Mount Sinai and Arabia Petraea: A Journal of Travels in the year 1838. Vol. 3. Boston: Crocker & Brewster.
