= Abillama dynasty =

Chieftains of the Metn region of Mount Lebanon

Abillama dynasty اللمعيون
- Emirs of the Matn
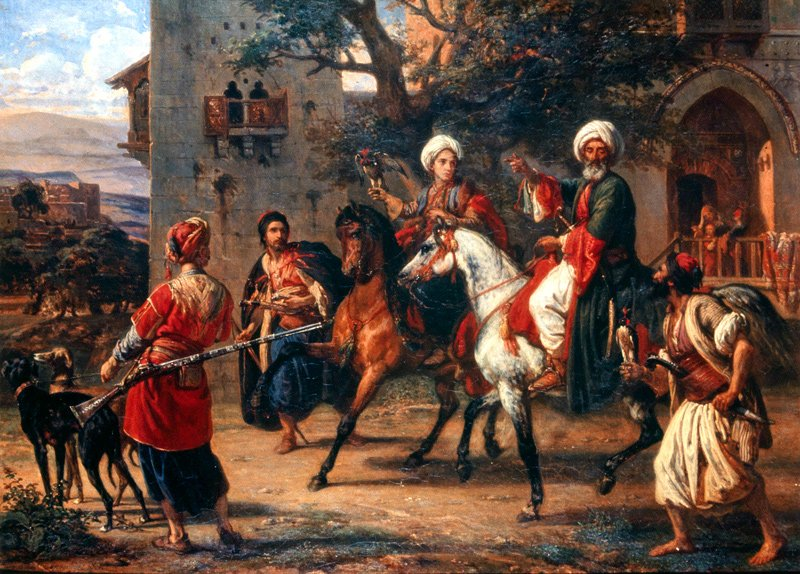
- Departure for Emir Ali Abillama's falcon hunt in front of his Salima palace, a painting by Antoine-Alphonse Montfort, c. 1837
- Country: Mount Lebanon Emirate, Ottoman Empire
- Founder: muqaddam Abi Al-Lamaʿ

The Abillama dynasty (Arabic: أبي اللمع, romanized: Abī al-Lamaʿ, sometimes shortened as بللّمع, Bil-Lamaʿ, also known as the Lamaʿids, Arabic: اللمعيون), was a prominent Arab Tanukhid clan. Later historical accounts trace the Abillama family to the Banu Fawaris, described as a branch associated with the Tanukhids. The family's securely documented history in Mount Lebanon is considerably later. By the late tenth century, (Note: fourth century AH) they had embraced the Druze faith. They relocated to Ras el-Matn c. 1108 – c. 1109, (Note: 502 AH) where their influence extended over Shahar al-Metn, al-Jurd, the Beqaa, and later Bikfaya. The Lamaʿ were affiliated with the Qaysi faction and emerged as key supporters of the Maʿnids during their rule over Mount Lebanon. During the conflict between the Qaysi and Yamani factions from 1600 to 1711, which culminated in the Qaysi victory, they rose to prominence, particularly under the leadership of Muqaddam Murad al-Lammaʿi. Following the Battle of Ain Dara in 1711, Haydar Shihab granted Murad al-Lamaʿi the title of Emir. Branches of the Abillama family gradually converted from the Druze faith to Maronite Christianity during the eighteenth and nineteenth centuries. Several residences and palaces built by members of the family survive in towns of the Metn, including Salima, Ras el-Matn and Bikfaya.

== History ==
=== Origins ===
Historical accounts identify the Abillamas as a branch of the Arab Tanukh clan that migrated from al-Hirah in modern-day Iraq to the Al-Aʿla Mountain, east of the city of Hama. Their arrival in Mount Lebanon is documented by Lebanese historian and priest Antun Daou's who recounts that the Tanukhids migrated in 820 from Al-Aʿla Mountain, driven by the heavy taxation imposed by the Abbasids, and in as a result of an incident involving a tax collector and a local woman. A man named Naba, outraged by the Abbasid official’s misconduct, killed him in retribution and fled to Lebanon with his family to escape the governor’s punishment. Historian Tannous Al-Shidyaq gives a similar account, adding that Naba sought refuge in Lebanon, where he founded the village of Kasarnaba, east of Keserwan near Baalbek. The governor of Aleppo’s demand for his surrender led his entire clan to migrate southward. A Tanukhid noble, known as Al-Mundhir, arrived with Naba’s tribe, along with ten clans, they settled in uninhabited lands, with Al-Mundhir settling in Sarhmoul and the others dispersing across the Lebanese mountain and surrounding territory. (Note: The ten clans that accompanied Emir Tanukh were: Banu Fawaris Arabic: بنو فوارس, Banu Azayim Arabic: بنو عزايم, Banu Abdullah Arabic: بنو عبدالله, Banu Tatyar Arabic: بنو تطير, Banu Khidr Arabic: بنو خضر, Banu Hilal Arabic: بنو هلال, Banu Shujaa Arabic: بنو شجاع, Banu Nimr Arabic: بنو نمر, Banu Shararah Arabic: بنو شرارة, and Banu Kasib Arabic: بنو كاسب.) Among the ten clans that migrated with Emir Tanukh were Banu Fawaris, from whom the Abillama family descends.

Lebanese historian Saqr Yusuf Saqr presents another reason for the Tanukhid migration is political persecution, as their displacement from Syria coincided with that of the Maronites, who were targeted for their alliance with the Umayyads. He posits that, as the Abbasids sought to eliminate the Umayyads and their supporters, both groups were forced to flee. The Maronites settled in Jbeil, Batroun, and northern Lebanon, while the Tanukhids established themselves in Wadi al-Taym and the surrounding mountainous regions. Saqr Yusuf Saqr interprets these traditions of displacement as contributing to later cooperation between the two communities.

The aforementioned Banu Fawaris tribe, included muqaddam Abi Al-Lamaʿ of Kfar Silwan, the ancestor of the Lamaʿid lineage. He was known for his conflict with the Banu Al-Sawaf. His direct descendants formed three branches of the Lamaʿid dynasty: Qayd Bey, Murad, and Fares. Hassan bin Abdullah is the forefather of the Qayd Bey branch in Salima. His descendants settled to Ras Al-Metn, Shbaniyeh, Brummana, Beit Shabab, and Bikfaya. Murad bin Abdullah was the forefather of the Murad branch whose descendants settled in Qarnayel, Falougha, Al-Abadiyeh, Roumieh, Beit Shabab, and Bhannes. Fares bin Muhammad bin Al-Lam‘ was the forefather of the Fares branch in Baskinta.

=== Early historical mentions and role as muqaddams ===
The first recorded mention of the Abillama family in written historical accounts dates back to the Mamluk period; after the Maronite Patriarch Jeremiah III of Dmalsâ went Rome in 1282 AD, his deputee Bishop Tadros al-Aqouri wrote:

The Abi Lamaʿ family, muqaddams of Shahhar, Jurd, and Beqaa, fought in the year 1294 AD alongside the residents of Keserwan against the Damascene army advancing into Keserwan, inflicting upon them a severe defeat at Ain Sannin. (Note: إن بيت اللمع مقدمي الشحار والجرد والبقاع حاربوا في سنة 1294 م. إلى جانب الكسروانيين الجيش الدمشقي الزاحف على كسروان فكسروه شر كسرة في عين صنين.)

The Lebanese historian Tannus al-Shidyaq recorded that in 1610, the residences and fields of the Abillama family were decimated and burned:

The soldiers roamed across the regions of Jbeil and Keserwan, storming locations where it was believed that the princes were in hiding. They set fire to the homes of the Abillama family, as well as the Khazen, Hamadiyya, and Ani’yya clans, along with their administrators. They cut down their trees, plundered these lands, and left them in ruins. (Note: أما العساكر فطفقوا يجولون في بلاد جبيل وكسروان ويدهمون المواضع التي يظن ان الامراء مختبئون فيها. واحرقوا دور اللمعيين والخوازنة والحمادية والمعنية ومدبريهم وقطعوا اشجارهم وعاثوا في تلك الديار وخربوها)

The Abillama took control over the Metn district, initially establishing themselves in Kfar Silwan, where they assumed the title of "Muqaddams of Kfar Silwan". They relocated to Ras el-Matn c. 1108 – c. 1109, where their influence extended over Shahar al-Metn, al-Jurd, the Beqaa, and later Bikfaya. In 1626 AD, Emir Yusuf Maan appointed the leaders of the Abillama family as the feudal lords (muqaddam) of Keserwan.

=== Aftermath of the Battle of Ain Dara ===
The Abillama were affiliated with the Qaysi faction and emerged as key supporters of the Maʿnids during their rule over Mount Lebanon. During the conflict between the Qaysi and Yamani factions from 1600 to 1711, which culminated in the Qaysi victory in the Battle of Ain Dara in 1711. The Abillama rose to prominence, particularly under the leadership of Muqaddam Murad al-Lamʿi who, as a result of his valor in the Battle of Ain Dara, was granted by the Emir of Mount Lebanon Haydar Shihabi the hereditary title of Emir. To strengthen the alliance between the Shihab and Abillama families, Haydar Shihab married the daughter of Hussein Abillama, he also arranged marriages between his own daughters and members of the Abillama family, further solidifying the familial bonds between the two houses. Haydar also instituted a policy of parity between Maronite and Druze feudal lords. he elevated the status of the Jumblatt family, granting them the title of sheikhs and awarding them the region of Chouf as their hereditary fiefdom, the Talhouq family was also raised to the rank of sheikhdom and granted the Upper Gharb region. Similarly, Sheikh Ali al-Nakadi was assigned the village of Naameh, while Sheikh Qablan al-Qadi was awarded the Iqlim of Jezzine. Jumblatt Abd al-Malik was given the same title, and the feudal governance of Keserwan was transferred to the Khazen family, while the Hobeish sheikhs retained their control over the district of Ghazir. Haydar also expanded the Abillama's territorial holdings in the Metn.

=== Kaimakamate and decline ===
After the fall of the Shihabi emirate in 1842, the Abillama family played a significant role in shaping Lebanon’s political landscape during the Ottoman era. When the Ottomans ended Shihabi rule and exiled Emir Bashir Shihab II to Istanbul, they appointed Omar Pasha al-Namsawi as governor of Mount Lebanon. This decision met resistance from Lebanese Christians, including Emir Haydar Abillama, who refused to cooperate with the new governor. Eventually, the Ottomans abandoned the idea of turning Lebanon into a Turkish province. A new system of governance was promulgated, dividing Lebanon into two districts (Kaymakamiyah): one Christian and one Druze. On 1 January 1843, Emir Haydar Ismail Abillama became the first Kaymakam of the Christian district, leading a turbulent period marked by sectarian strife and foreign interference. He died of a stroke on 11 May 1854 and was buried in Bikfaya. He was replaced by his nephew, Emir Bashir Assaf Abillama, by appointment from the Wali of Beirut Wassif Pasha. Bashir Assaf assumed the role but faced opposition, including from European consuls and local factions, particularly from Khorshid Pasha, the new Wali of Beirut, which led to his ouster only four months after his appointment, and replacement by Emir Bashir Ahmad Abillama of Brummana in August 1854. The newly appointed Kaymakam relocated the administrative seat from Bikfaya to his hometown, Broummana, and faced growing opposition from the Lama‘ids, and the sheikhs of Keserwan the Khazin, the Hbeish families. On 11 May 1858, he fled to Beirut following public unrest, and on 27 May 1858, the Abillamas convened in Baabdat, unanimously rejecting his return to office. He remained however in office until 1860 when he was removed and replaced by Emir Hassan Abillama as caretaker. After his removal, Bashir Ahmad Abillama, sought to punish his rivals, the sheikhs of Keserwan. His actions instigated the rebellion against them, leading to what became known as the Peasants' Revolt or the uprising of Tanyus Shahin.

== Religious affiliation and conversion ==
The Tanukhids were initially Arab polytheists. They converted to Nestorian Christianity around 410 CE under Al-Nu'man I ibn Imru al-Qays, the king of the Lakhmid Arabs and converted to Islam after its rise in 624 CE. By the late tenth to eleventh century, the Tanukhids adopted the Druze faith becoming adherents and proselytizer in Wadi al-Taym. In the early 18th century, Druze elites in Mount Lebanon began converting to Christianity due to their interactions with foreign missionaries, Maronite clergy, and other Eastern Christian sects, and particularly after a branch of the Shihab dynasty converted from Sunni Islam. The first recorded conversion was that of Abdallah Qaid Bey al-Lam‘i, who (d. 1717). This gradual process, lasting until the late 19th century, stemmed from the expansion of Christianity among the Druze nobility—particularly through Maronite influence—the efforts of Latin missionaries such as the Capuchins and Jesuits, and the spread of Maronite monastic orders like the Antonins. After the conversion of Abdallah Qayd Bey Abillama to Maronite Christianity, the sons of Prince Nassar Murad Al-Lama’i in Metn followed suit under the influence of Bishop Boulos Karam of Baskinta, then the Lama’id emirs of Qarnayel also converted around 1790 AD. Christianity later spread to Brummana and Beit Mary via the Antonine monks and to Ras Al-Matn through the Lebanese Maronite Order.

=== Relations with the Christian church in the 18th century ===
In the 18th century, Christian-Druze relations, particularly between Maronites and Druze, strengthened. As a result, some Druze endowments (awqaf) were allocated to Christian monasteries. The Capuchins maintained close ties with Emir Abdullah Abi al-Lamaʿ of Salima, while the Jesuits were connected to Emir Haydar Abi al-Lamaʿ of Bikfaya. The Antonine Order, the Lebanese Maronite Order, the Basilian Chouerite Order, and the Basilian Salvatorian Order offered their monasteries, educational and medical services to the Druze elite. The Abillama family supported monasteries with endowments and aid. Before converting to Christianity, they dedicated churches and monasteries. After conversion, they maintained ties with monks and patriarchs, overseeing religious endowments. Below is a lit of monasteries endowed by the Abillama emirs:

Monasteries and Endowments by the Abi al-Lamaʿ Family
Monastery or endowment name	Date	Location
Mar Gerges al-Harf	1691	Al-Harf
Mar Shaaya Monastery	1698	Brummana
Capuchin Monastery of Salima	1705	Salima
Mar Youhanna al-Qal'a Monastery	1748	Beit Mery
Mar Youssef Monastery	1773	Hammana
Mar Sema'an Monastery	1750	Ayn al-Qabou
Mar Elias Monastery	1749	Qornayel
Mar Antonios Monastery	11 September 1772	Unknown
Mar Taqla al-Rouh Church	1793	Taqla al-Rouh
Mar Youhanna Monastery	18th century	Zikrit
Sayyidat al-Najat Monastery	1833	Bikfaya
Maronite See of Damascus	1858–1866	Damascus
Emir Murad Yusuf Abi al-Lamaʿ’s Endowment	19th century	Beirut & Beit Mery
Mar Afrem Monastery	Undocumented	Shbanieh
Mar Roukoz Monastery	Undocumented	Dekweneh
Mar Elias Monastery	Undocumented	Antelias
Mar Antonios Monastery	Undocumented	Beit Shabab

== Architectural works and legacy ==
According to Zinat, the Battle of Ain Dara in 1711 marked a historical turning point in the adoption and spread of Islamic architecture within the fiefdoms governed by the Lamaʿid emirs. This shift occurred following their alliance through marriage with Emir Haydar Shihab, the Emir of Mount Lebanon at the time. This architectural transformation manifested in the infiltration and integration of Islamic architectural and decorative elements into the structures of Mount Lebanon, the center of the Lamaʿid emirs. This is evident in their palaces and residences in Salima, Ras al-Matn, Qarnayel, Falougha, Bekfaya, and Beit Shabab. The influence of their architectural style extended to the boundaries of their fiefdom, reaching as far as the Nahr al-Kalb River after the Battle of Ain Dara.
