= Mansourieh, Lebanon =

Mansourieh المنصورية
- City
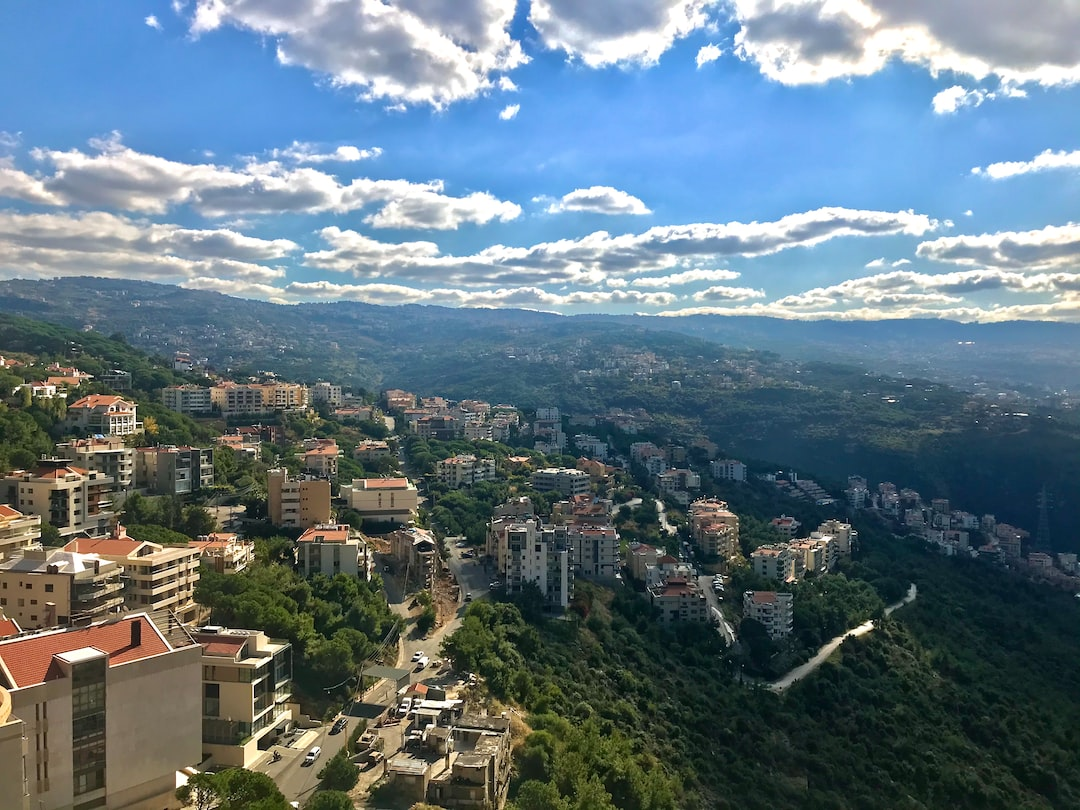
- Birds-eye view of Mansourieh

- Location within Lebanon
- Coordinates: 33°51′29″N 35°34′7″E
- Country: Lebanon
- Governorate: Mount Lebanon Governorate
- District: Matn District

Government
  - Time Zone: GMT +2 (UTC)
  - - Summer (DST): +3 (UTC)
  - Area Code(s): (+961) 4
  - Postal code: 22411

Area
  - Total: 2.83 km^{2} (1.09 sq mi)
- Highest elevation: 350 m (1,150 ft)
- Lowest elevation: 200 m (660 ft)
- Time zone: UTC+2 (EET)
  - Summer (DST): UTC+3 (EEST)
- Dialing code: +961

Mansourieh (Arabic: المنصورية translit. al-Manṣūriyyah), also known by various spellings, including: el-Mansourieh, Mansouriyeh, Mansouriyet el-Matn, and el-Mansouria is a town in the Matn District of the Mount Lebanon Governorate, in Lebanon. This place holds significant historical importance due to the presence of well-preserved archaeological remains, specifically a Roman aqueduct.

== Overview ==
Mansourieh, situated on a hilltop just 10 kilometres east of Beirut, serves as the gateway to Northern Matn, offering panoramic views of the capital.

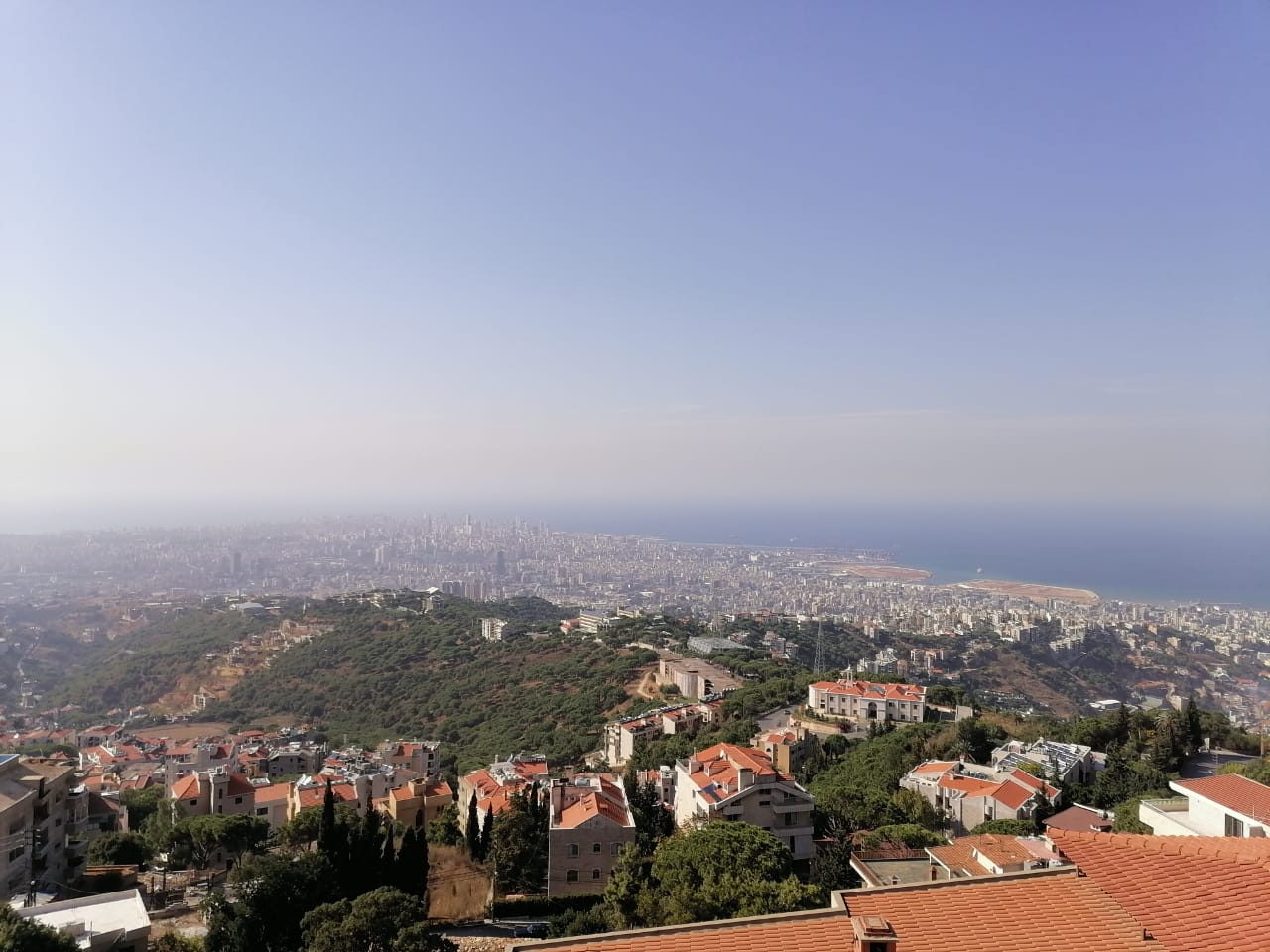
Bird's-eye view of Beirut from Mansourieh.

== Etymology ==
The name originates from the Arabic: منصور (translit. Manṣūr) meaning victorious, presumably dating back to a battle between the Crusaders and the Arabs in which the latter emerged victorious.

== Geography ==
Mansourieh consists of the old village, seated on top of a ridge, bordered to the south and southwest by a river, the Beirut River and to the north by the Mar Roukouz (Arabic for Saint Roch) ravine. Upwards to the east, Mansourieh merges with Ain Saadeh and Monte Verde-Beit Mery, and slopes downhill westwards to Mkalles and Sin el-Fil. Across the river to the southwest lies Hazmieh, a town part of the Baabda district. Daychounieh covers the southeastern side, facing Baabda and Louaize.

Mansourieh is conveniently located 16 kilometres east to the capital Beirut, 16 kilometres north to Baabda, the Province Administrative Center, and 12 kilometres south to Jdeideh, the Caza Administrative Center. Mansourieh slopes upwards from an elevation of approximately 200 metres to reach its highest at around 350 meters above sea level.

Until the early 1950s, Mansourieh was mostly a rural area. Plains along the banks of the Beirut River were cultivated with citrus orchards. Olive groves were traditionally grown in more arid areas. Pine forests covered the southeastern slopes. Vineyards and fig trees, along with other Mediterranean cultivars, completed the landscape. Due to intensive urbanization since the second half of the last century, many green areas have been replaced by residential and commercial buildings. Few green areas remain, mainly along the river bank.

Mansourieh lies on the main road running from Beirut through Sin el-Fil and Mkalles, winding up the mountain to reach Baabdat, Bikfaya, and upper Matn. The 'Ras el-Matn' road connects Northern Matn to Southern Matn villages, starting from Monte Verde.

Mansourieh is a lively hub with a variety of shops, restaurants, and supermarkets. The old road showcases scenic views of Beirut alongside residential areas, while the Mansourieh highway bustles with food chains, retail shops, and high mobility traffic.

The Beirut River flows east to west from Lebanon's mountains passing through the south of Mansourieh to the Mediterranean Sea. The River is crossed by a dam locally called 'Jisr es-Sid' (Arabic for 'bridge of the dam') built during the French mandate for Syria and the Lebanon. With the dam, part of the river water is diverted to irrigate the Hadath and Kfarshima coastal planes. A bridge on top of the dam links Mansourieh to Hazmieh's Mar Takla and Mar Roukouz neighborhoods.

The municipality of Mansourieh also administers the industrialized Mkalles zone and the Daychounieh village.

== Demographics ==
As of 2009, Mansourieh houses a population of approximately 17,000 of whom 1,445 are voters and 2,254 native residents. Residences number approximately 4,500.

== Education ==
Mansourieh is home to the following educational institutions:

- Eastwood College EWC
- Lebanese University, Faculty of Humanities
- The Al-Kafaàt University

In addition to the institutions found within the town limits, several others are located in its suburbs:

- Université Saint Joseph , Faculty of Engineering and Architecture (Mar Roukouz)
- Sagesse High School, Mary Mother of Wisdom (Ain Saadeh)
- Lebanese University, Faculty of Humanities in Fanar (Fanar)

== Medical institutions ==
- Beit Al Ajouz
- Bellevue Medical Center

== Archaeological sites ==
Located in the secluded river valley between Mansourieh and Hazmieh are the remains of a Roman aqueduct.

During the Roman period, with the expanding urbanization of Beirut, the demand for running water outgrew the capacity of the existing wells and springs. The solution was to get water from one of the springs located along the Beirut River. The nearest spring was the Daychounieh source, situated 20 kilometres southeast of Beirut. The Roman architects built a water channel to convey this water across the Beirut River and transport it onwards to Beirut.

It was built over an arched, bridge-like structure known today as 'Qanater es-Sett Zubaida' (Arabic for 'the arches of Lady Zubaida). The aqueduct consisted of a series of arches, of which only a few remain on the sides of the river.

It was built in 273 AD, during the reign of Roman emperor Aurelian and was also used as a way station for the Roman military in Lebanon. The name Zubaida can be identified with the famous Queen Zenobia of Palmyra, who may have built it. It can also be associated with Princess Zubaida, wife of caliph Haroun ar-Rashid. Curiously, another Roman aqueduct on the Nahr Ibrahim (Adonis river) bears the same name.

== Religion ==
Mansourieh natives are predominantly Greek Orthodox. Population influx in the last 20 years diversified the religious panorama to include Maronites and other Christian denominations.

=== Churches ===
- Mar Elias (Saint Elijah Church) – Greek Orthodox
- Miled Es-Saydeh (Nativity of Mary Church) – Greek Orthodox
- Mar Gergis (Saint George Church) – Maronite (Daychounieh)
- Mar Elias (Saint Elijah Church) – Greek Orthodox (Mkalles)
- Mar Elias (Saint Elijah Church) – Maronite (Mkalles)

== Families ==
- Hajj (Abdo, Hajj, Issa, Khattar, Nakhle,Khoury, Wakim, Zeidan)
- Hamouche (Abi Khalil, Abi Nassif, Abi Rached, Hamouche, Kaadi, Merhej, Sakr)
- Awwad (عوّاد)

=== Hajj Family ===
The Hajj family history traces back to the 17th century when its ancestor Hanna el-Hajj fled his hometown of Beit Mellat, a village in Akkar in the North. He finally settled near the river at the southern edge of modern-day Mansourieh. Hanna 'Hawwa' el-Hajj, was son to a family of seven brothers and a sister named Hawwa (Arabic for Eve), hence the surname. The whole family, Christian Greek Orthodox by denomination, worked at a flour mill owned by a Muslim Emir. A dispute broke out between the Hajj family and the Emir, which led to the Emir’s murder and the banishment of the Hajj family. Some of the family members escaped to Byblos and later moved to other villages. Little is known of Hanna, but his journey and dwellings in different places (Byblos, Antelias, Achrafieh, Chiyah), proves him as an expedient man willing to fight for his rights and possessions. Quarrels with local inhabitants forced him to change places, finally settling in the Zireh-Daychounieh area south of Mansourieh.

At the time, the land belonged to Druze families, mainly the Badghan clan. They hired labor to cultivate and care for their livestock. Hanna worked for those families in exchange for land. In Zireh Hanna built a small church, erect to this day although disused, known as Mar Gergis (Arabic for Saint George), where he was eventually buried. Hanna had two sons Youssef and Moussa.

In those days, the entire area was under control of the feudal Abillama Emirs. According to accounts, a group of men encountered harsh weather while traveling to Mtein village, necessitating an overnight stay at Hanna's residence. Overwhelmed by their host's generosity, they related the episode to the Emir who, somewhat envious, decided to get rid of Hanna and dispatched his troops to that effect. Hanna, sensing trouble, greeted them with the same hospitality, leading to a reconciliation with the Emir.

Youssef and Moussa inherited their father’s competencies, generosity, and cunning, strengthening the relation with the Emir. The Emir summoned the two brothers and asked them to work his land instead. They accepted and moved to uptown Mansourieh, closer to the Emir whereabouts. Married, they lived in what is known to this day as the 'Harah' in the heart of the village.

=== Hamouche Family ===
Stories have it that the 16th-century family of Hamouche originated in a small village named Mizlla near Maad in Byblos. The father, a righteous man, was known to protect Christians from persecutions. His antagonists retaliated against the children after their father’s demise. As a result, the family of four children, Trad, Hamouche, Malek, and Melki scattered to different locations around Lebanon.

The family first moved to Ain el-Qabou near Baskinta, Trad then spent winters in Beirut, and Hamouche in Mansourieh where he eventually settled. Malek later moved to Baabdat, and Melki to the North.

In subsequent generations the Hajj family acquired the lands in the middle and lower parts of Mansourieh, while the Hamouche family dwelt in the upper parts of the village.

== Gallery ==
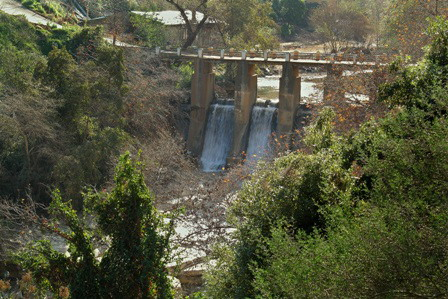
One-lane bridge linking Mansourieh and Hazmieh

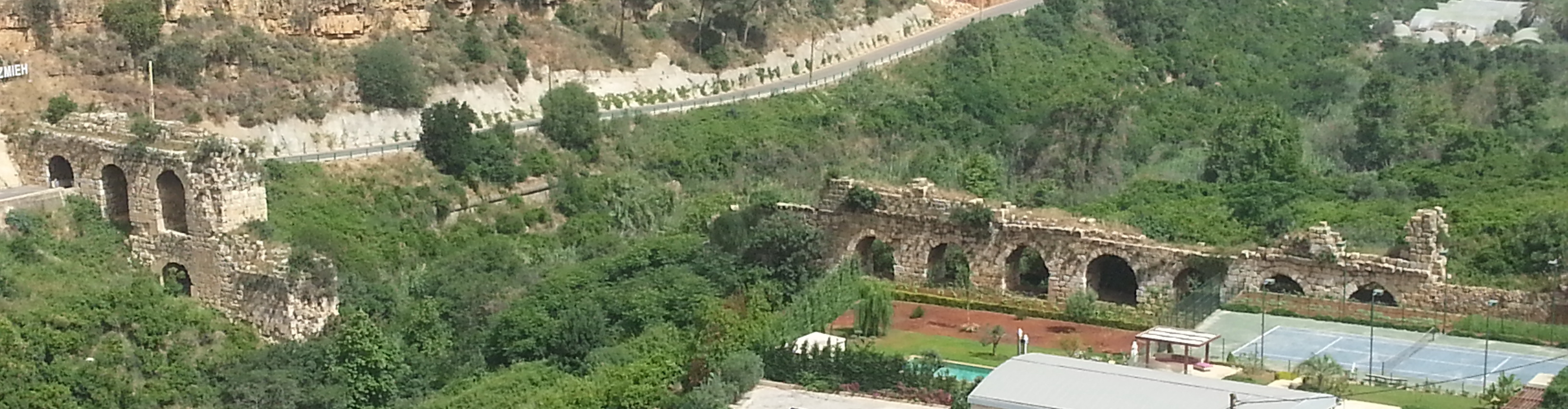
Remains of the Roman aqueduct

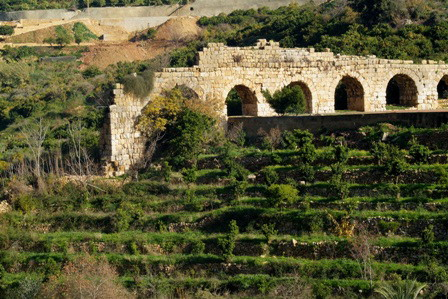
Remains of the Roman aqueduct

Mansourieh's Bellevue Medical Center
