= Bellevue Medical Center =

Bellevue Medical Center may refer to:

- Bellevue Medical Center (Lebanon), a hospital in Mansourieh, Lebanon
- Bellevue Medical Center (Nebraska), a hospital in Bellevue, Nebraska
- Bellevue Hospital, a hospital in New York City
