= Hammana =

- City
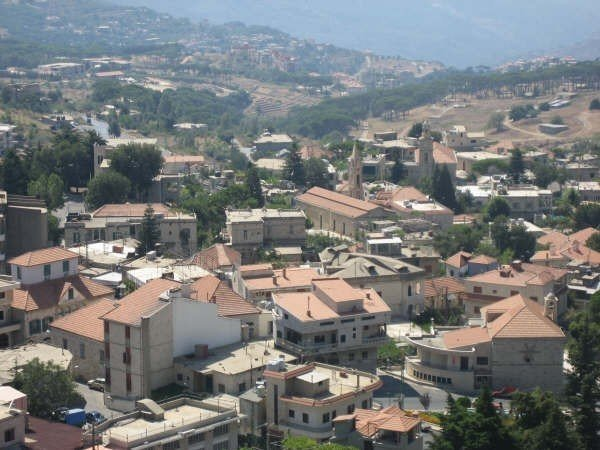
- Hammana, 2009

- Location within Lebanon
- Coordinates: 33°49′31″N 35°44′0″E
- Country: Lebanon
- Governorate: Mount Lebanon Governorate
- District: Baabda District
- Elevation: 1,200 m (3,900 ft)
- Time zone: UTC+2 (EET)
  - Summer (DST): UTC+3 (EEST)
- Dialing code: +961(0)553

Hammana (Arabic: حمانا, romanized: Ḥammānā) is a town in Lebanon, about 26 km (16 miles) east of Beirut. At an altitude of 1200 m (about 4000 ft) above sea level, Hammana is in the Mount Lebanon Governorate in the district (or Caza) of Baabda. Hammana is bordered by the towns of Falougha, Shbaniye, Khraybe, Bmariam, Khalwet and Mdeirej.

== Etymology ==
The word "Hammana" may have come from the name of the Phoenecian sun god "Hammon", "Hamman", or "Naram". Both names are derived from the word "Hama", which means heat of the sun.

Hamonah is mentioned in the Book of the Prophet Ezekiel, a city of memorial unto the triumph of the Lord GOD over his people's adversaries.

== History ==
The 19th-century French poet, novelist and statesman Alphonse de Lamartine visited Lebanon and spent some time in Hammana. He described the town and its surrounding lush valley in his Voyages en Orient (1835) as "one of the most beautiful prospects ever presented to the human eye to scan in the works of God".

Hammana has a rich diversity of religious communities consisting of Maronites, Greek Orthodox, Greek Catholics, Muslims and Druze. It is a popular summer resort destination for many Lebanese and non-Lebanese tourists.

== Facilities ==
The village has multiple water sources like the Shaghour fall, Ain-al-Hosa spring, Al-Kadaneh spring, Ain Soltan spring, Ain Maytri spring and many more. Evergreen trees such as pines, firs, spruce as well as some cedar trees are found everywhere in the town. Hammana is known regionally for its cherries, apples and fasolia beans (lubieh hammanieh). The Sohat spring water bottling plant (now owned by Nestlé) is located nearby in Falougha.

== Ecotourism ==
On 25 November 2011, Municipality of Hammana and Barcelona/Cercs Bergueda signed the agreement of the second phase for the Ecotourism Project.

- Around 25 residents of Hammana signed on to be part of the project, and received training to be able to run different activities for the project.
- Around 5 households in Hammana signed on to have their homes serve as guest houses to receive and host visitors for the project.

The official ecotourism launching and certificates distribution ceremony was held at the municipality public garden on Saturday July 9, 2011.

== Events and festivals ==
Hammana is known for its cherries, and every year the municipality holds a cherry festival, between end of May and June.

This event is usually 1 to 2 days. Families visit Hammana to enjoy the activities for both adults and for children, which include cherry picking, games and small excursions around the village. Of course, local cherries and homemade goods are sold at this event. Some people even create recipes with cherries, like kebab cherry, cherry cheesecake, and some delicious cherry jam and butter crepes.
