= Daychounieh =

Daychounieh الديشونية
- City
- Location within Lebanon
- Coordinates: 33°51′N 35°34′E
- Country: Lebanon
- Governorate: Mount Lebanon Governorate
- District: Matn District

Government
  - Time Zone: GMT +2 (UTC)
  - - Summer (DST): +3 (UTC)
  - Area Code(s): (+961) 4
  - Postal code: 22415

Area
  - Total: 1.33 km^{2} (0.51 sq mi)
- Highest elevation: 250 m (820 ft)
- Lowest elevation: 200 m (660 ft)
- Time zone: UTC+2 (EET)
  - Summer (DST): UTC+3 (EEST)
- Dialing code: +961

Daychounieh (Arabic: الديشونية translit. al-Dayšūniyat, also Al-Daychounieh) is a village in the Matn District of the Mount Lebanon Governorate, Lebanon. Daychounieh is administered by Mansourieh municipality.

== Overview ==
Daychounieh native people are from Sakr, Khoury and Abou Khalil families.

== Geography ==
Daychounieh is 11 km to the Capital (Beirut), 26 km to the Province Administrative Center (Baabda) and 15 km to the Caza Administrative Center (Jdeideh).

Daychounieh is accessible from Mansourieh main road.

Beirut River flows east to west from Lebanon's mountains passing through Daychounieh to the Mediterranean Sea.

== Demographics ==
As of 2009, Daychounieh houses a population of approx. 800, of which 98 constitute the electorate and 153 are native residents. The number of residences is approx. 250.
