= Bellevue Medical Center (Lebanon) =

- North Facade of the Bellevue Medical Center

Geography
- Location: Qanater Zubayda- Mansouriyeh, Mansourieh, Metn District, Lebanon
- Coordinates: 33.848457°N 35.559479°E

Organisation
- Care system: Two-tier
- Type: Community, District
- Affiliated university: Université Saint-Joseph

Services
- Standards: Lebanese private hospitals accreditation, JCI, Planetree
- Emergency department: Yes
- Beds: 130

History
- Founded: July 2009

Links
- Website: http://www.bmc.com.lb/

Bellevue Medical Center (Arabic: مستشفى ومركز بلفو الطبي, BMC) founded in July 2009, is a community hospital located in Mansourieh, Lebanon. It offers healthcare services in many specialties. It has a capacity of 130 beds within its eight floors. Bellevue Medical Center is a Joint Commission International (JCI) accredited and Planetree Gold designated hospital.

== Departments and services ==
Bellevue Medical Center provides Medical treatment services in the following specialties:

- Allergology
- Anesthesiology & Pain Management

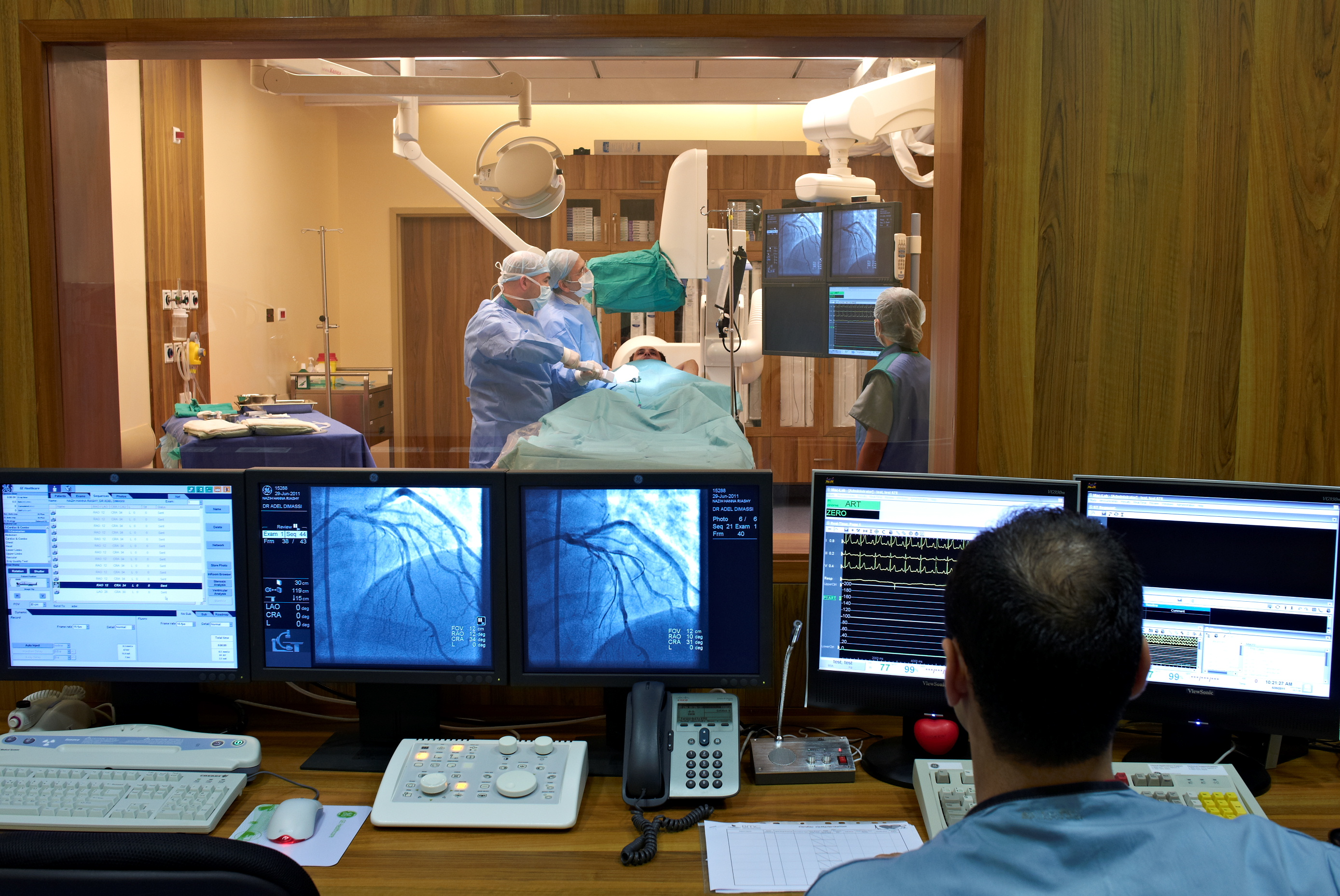
Cardiology

- Cardiology
- Dermatology
- Emergency Care
- Endocrinology
- Family Medicine
- Gastroenterology
- General Surgery
- Hematology
- Immunology
- Infectious diseases
- Intensive Care Unit
- Internal Medicine
- In-Vitro Fertility
- Neonatal Intensive Care
- Nephrology
- Neurology
- Neurosurgery
- Obstetrics & Gynecology
- Oncology
- Ophthalmology
- Orthopedics
- Otolaryngology (ENT)
- Pediatrics
- Plastic Surgery
- Psychiatry
- Pulmonary Medicine
- Rheumatology
- Urology
- Vascular Surgery

As well, it has the following clinical services:

- Chemotherapy
- Clinical Laboratory
- Clinical Nutrition
- Dialysis

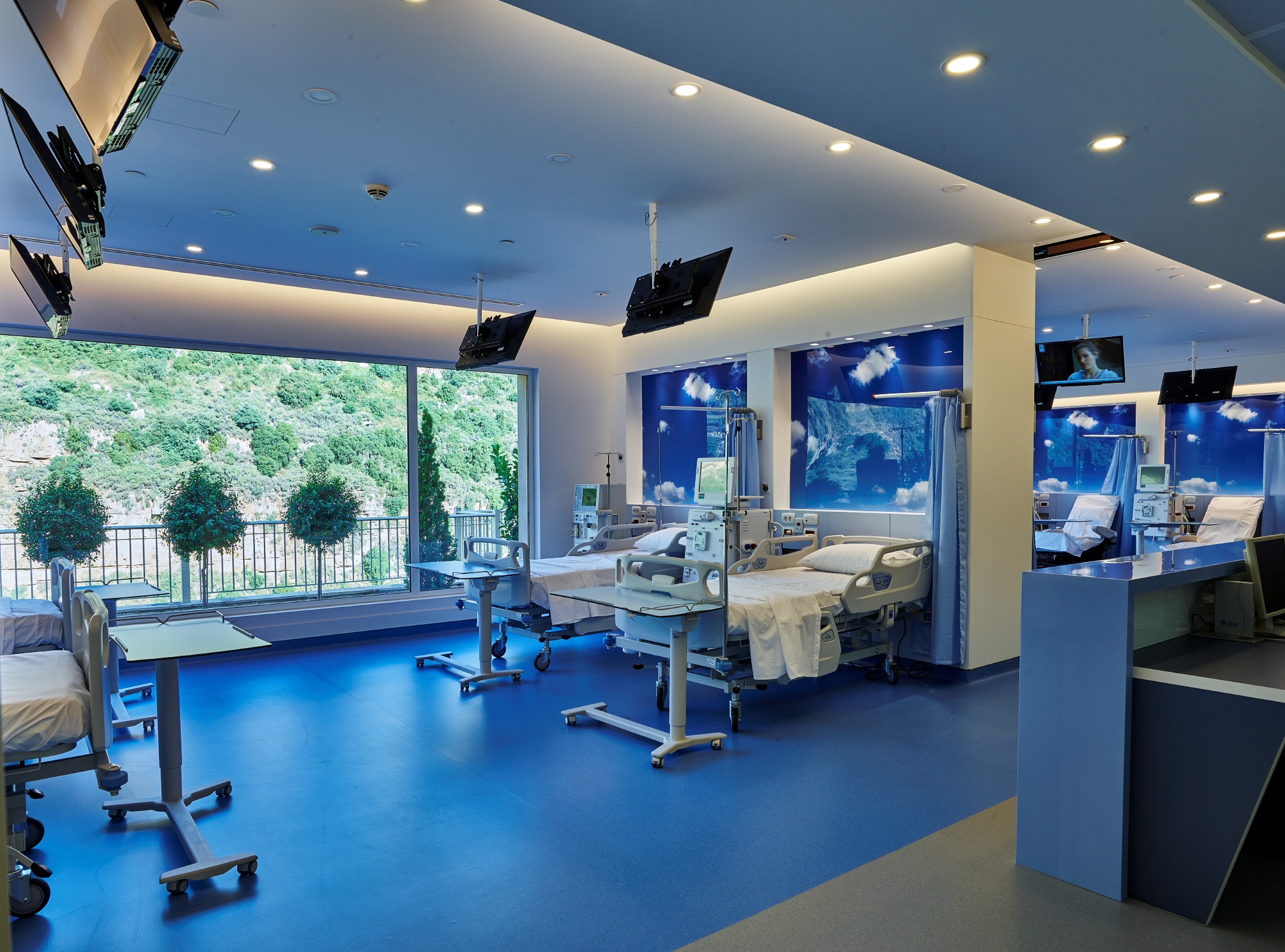
Dialysis Center

- Pharmacy
- Psychotherapy & Counseling
- Radiology
- Rehabilitation & Physical Therapy
- Respiratory Therapy

In addition, BMC has:

- Maternity Center offering all prenatal, peri-natal, and post-natal services.
- Training Center providing training and education about various medical topics to and from healthcare professionals.

== Affiliation ==
The hospital is also affiliated with Lebanese and European centers of medical education, Saint Joseph University, Lebanese American University.

== Certificates ==
BMC received the Joint Commission International accreditation, for patient safety and quality for healthcare, in October 2012 becoming one of three Lebanese hospitals to meet JCI standards; BMC was re-accredited by the JCI in 2015 and 2018.

In March 2014, Bellevue Medical Center won the ‘Quality Improvement and Patient Safety’ Award at the MedHealth MENA Congress and was certified Green Hospital in 2023.

In March 2017, Bellevue Medical Center was accredited with HACCP certification for food safety.

Bellevue Medical Center is awarded the Best Health Operator of the year 2017 by “International Finance Magazine”. In June 2018, Bellevue was the first hospital in Lebanon to be granted the Planetree gold designation.

== Location ==
Located on the eastern bank of the Beirut River in the Mansourieh's Qanater Zubayda region, Bellevue Medical Center overlooks an ancient Roman aqueduct known to locals as Qanater Zubayda (Zubayda's Arches). It is 5 minutes away from Mkalles roundabout and 15 minutes away from downtown Beirut.

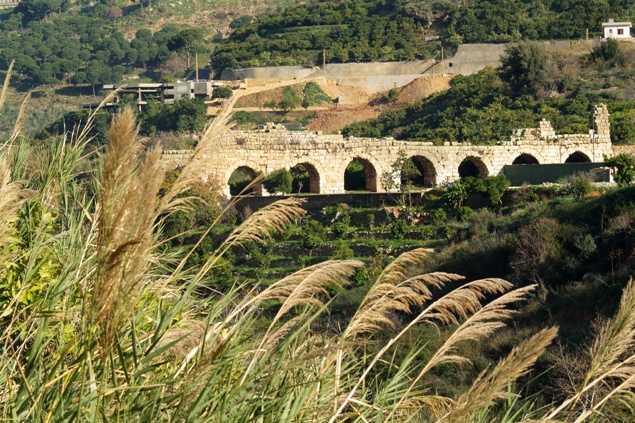
The remains of the Qanater Zubayda Roman aqueduct.
