= Forn El Chebbak =

Forn El Chebbak فرن الشباك
- City
- Interactive map of Forn El Chebbak
- Location within Lebanon
- Coordinates: 33°52′19″N 35°31′39″E
- country: Lebanon
- Governorate: Mount Lebanon
- District: Baabda

Government
  - Type: Municipal
  - Mayor: Rizkallah Semaan

Area
  - Total: 1.6 km^{2} (0.62 sq mi)
- Elevation: 61 m (200 ft)

Population
  - Total: 65,000
- Time zone: UTCUTC+02:00
  - Summer (DST): UTC+03:00
- Tahwitit El Naher neighborhood / post. code: 5181
- Ain El remene neighborhood / post. code: 5523
- Area code: +961

Forn El Chebbak (Arabic: فرن الشباك) is a city in the east suburb of Beirut in the Baabda district of the Mount Lebanon Governorate.

The municipality of Furn El Chebbak, which also encompasses the neighborhoods of Ain El Remmaneh and Tahwitet El Nahr, was officially founded on June 3,1922 by Decree No. 1379 under President Mr. Trabeau.

Originally a quiet rural and semi-urban locality, its strategic geographic position bordering Beirut turned it into a major residential, commercial, and educational hub.

The city houses notable companies such as Alfa Telecommunications Company, Madinat al Mafrouchat (Citi Furniture) multiple Banks, Insurance Companies, among others. It is also a shopping destination given its famous and historic shopping street (Furn El Chebbak Souk).

The city of Forn El Chebbak is home to two faculties of the Lebanese university such as the faculty of pedagogy and National Institute of Fine Arts. in addition to the Sagesse University, and the Lebanese Order of Physicians.

In the 20th century it was on the main connection line to Beirut's tramway and railway networks.

Many lands in the city were historically owned by then ruling noble families of Lebanon.

Despite it's high density and urban development, the city still has calm neighbourhoods with tree-lined seclusion such as the Mountazah neighbourhood, home to modern residential buildings, and historic villas, such as Villa El Asmar, built in the early 1900s by late tobacco tycoon, Youssef El Asmar, to his son, finance titan, Edward El Asmar and family.
