= Beirut River =

River in Lebanon

Beirut River نهر بيروت
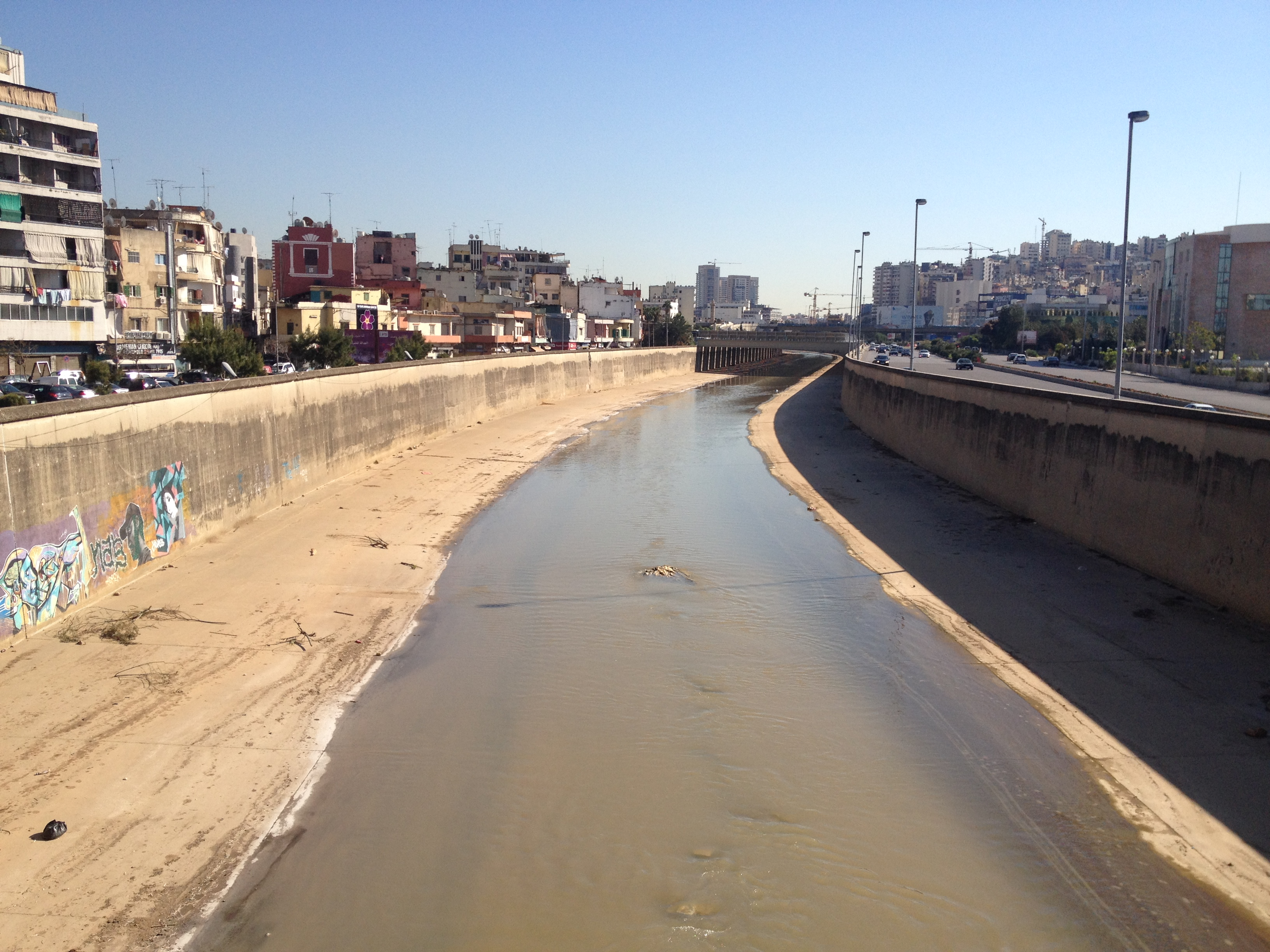
- The Beirut River, between Beirut and Bourj Hammoud, 2015

Location
- Country: Lebanon

Physical characteristics
- Source
  - location: Mount Sannine
  - coordinates: 33.905°N 35.784°E
- Mouth
  - location: Mediterranean Sea
  - coordinates: 33.905°N 35.542°E
- Length: 29 km (18 mi)
- Basin size: 320 km^{2} (120 sq mi)

The Beirut River (Arabic: نهر بيروت, Nahr Bayrūt) is a 29-kilometre (18 mi) long river in Lebanon separating the city of Beirut from its eastern suburbs, primarily Bourj Hammoud and Sin el Fil. The river flows mostly east to west from snow drains and springs on the western slopes of Mount Kneisseh and the southern end of Mount Sannine near the towns of Hammana and Falougha, before curving north and emptying at Beirut's northern Mediterranean coast, east of the Port of Beirut. According to popular legend, St. George slew the dragon in a spot near the mouth of the river.

== History ==
During the Stone Age, the land on which Beirut is now built was two islands in the delta of the Beirut River, but over the centuries the river silted up and the two islands were connected into one land mass. The right bank of the Beirut River, southwest of the mountain resort town of Beit Mery at an altitude of approximately 125 metres (410 ft) above sea level, is an archaeological site, "Beit Mery I", discovered by Jesuit Father Dillenseger who determined it to be an Acheulean site; the archaeological finds from the site were donated to the French Faculty of Medicine at Saint Joseph University.

=== Antiquity ===
In antiquity, the river was known as Magoras and was the site of the worship of the god of Heliopolis. The Romans built an aqueduct, which had a 240-meter bridge crossing the river, to supply Beirut (Berytus) with water. In the 1880s the aqueduct at Mansourieh was named after Queen Zenobia.

=== Renaissance ===
It is believed that Fakhreddine, Lebanon's Renaissance prince, built or repaired a bridge of seven arches on the river that was a streamlet in summer but swelled into a raging torrent in winter.

=== Industrial Age ===
In the Industrial Age, the banks of the river, which had been marshy lands that flooded each winter season, especially in Bourj Hammoud, became home to warehouses and shipping services due to the close proximity of the river to the port. By the mid-1800s, Beirut had expanded to within 10 kilometers of the river, which continued to supply the city with water via the Roman aqueduct.

== Environment ==
=== Beirut River Valley ===
According to environmentalists, the 20-kilometer valley of the Beirut River, especially the upper valley, is one of the most important areas for bird migration in Lebanon, including birds of 33 different species, such as the European honey buzzard, common buzzard (Buteo buteo), Levant sparrowhawk (Accipiter brevipes), white stork, white pelican, European nightjar (Caprimulgus europaeus), European bee-eater (Merops apiaster), barn swallow (Hirundo rustica) and the lesser spotted eagle.

=== Urban sprawl ===
The river valley stretches across several municipalities that do not formally protect it from hunting, fire, urban development, deforestation, water pollution and overgrazing. Once the river reaches the city limits of the Greater Beirut metropolitan area, it becomes heavily polluted, with the major source of pollution being industrial waste from various factories along the bank as well as sewage and refuse from the slaughterhouse in Karantina. In 2004, Cedar Environmental built a composter, aiming to prevent the slaughterhouse from directly dumping waste into the Beirut River.

=== Flood risk ===
The river was transformed from a riparian river to a concrete canal within the Beirut conurbation in 1968. In 1970, extensive work was done along the river bank to protect the eastern suburb of Bourj Hammoud from floods. In 1974, ETEC Consulting Engineers were hired to design a flood control system that included a channel 32 meters wide with a capacity of 800 m^{3}/s.

Environmentalists warned in 2003 that some construction companies were dumping illegally in the river, which prompted the passing of Law 148, stipulating that all construction projects should be located at least 500 meters away from the main rivers in Lebanon.

In 2005, storms caused flood damage in the suburbs of Bourj Hammoud and Karantina, and a bridge adjacent to the Port of Beirut collapsed due to water pressure. In 2005, the City of Bourj Hammoud in conjunction with CETE Méditerranée with logistical support from the City of Marseille, initiated a risks diagnosis that revealed seismic, flood and technological risks for the suburb.

=== Rehabilitation ===
There is great interest among the Lebanese to rehabilitate the Beirut River and turn it into a sustainable, green public space, as well as an environmentally friendly transportation and water reserve system.

In 2009, Sandra Frem proposed in her dissertation at Massachusetts Institute of Technology "measures for restoring the river, creating public space and enhancing the quality and management of water".

In 2010, Phillipe Skaff, head of Green Party of Lebanon, proposed a 10-year plan, envisioned by ERGA Architecture House of Elie and Randa Gebrayel, to turn the Beirut River into a conservation area containing parks, nature reserves, bike-paths, sports facilities, cafes and verdant boulevards as well as a high-speed electric train.

Also in 2010, a studio course, "An Alternative Guide to Beirut: A Studio on Infrastructure & Tourism", offered at the American University of Beirut's Department of Architecture and Design and facilitated by Carla Aramouny and J. Matthew Thomas encouraged students to propose sustainable solutions for the Greater Beirut metropolitan area, including the rehabilitation of the river. Carl Gerges' "Beirut River in Sin el Fil", Ralph Gebara's "Hybrid Beirut", and Nathalie Saleh's "The Beirut Thermal Baths" were among the creative ideas proposed.

In 2010, Sabbag Assi Architects proposed a 210,000-m^{2} urban-master plan for the development of the former agricultural lands that existed between the Beirut River and the Beirut-Damascus highway; the aim was to prevent a disorganized urban development of the area and to allow for a sustainable increase in land value. The plan included vehicular and pedestrian streets, combined with landscaped public space and cultural facilities, such as a museum of modern art.

To date, the government of Lebanon has not taken any initiative to rehabilitate the river, and the creative ideas proposed by numerous Lebanese environmentalists and architects remain on paper. Since 2013, theOtherDada, a regenerative architecture and consultancy firm led by Adib Dada, has been conducting extensive research on the Beirut River and its neighboring areas. The Beirut RiverLESS research project explored how this natural riparian ecosystem was transformed into a sewage infrastructure, a no man's land which inhibited the rich cultural practices around the site. The ongoing research covers the historical, cultural and environmental aspects of the site and is conducted through field research, community meetings, student competitions, and artist commissions.

In May 2019, theOtherDada planted Lebanon's first native urban forest, Beirut's RiverLESS Forest, in collaboration with SUGi and Afforestt. Located on the north bank of the river in Sin el Fil, the project restored the forest ecosystem that previously existed along the river. The second part of the planting was completed in November 2019, amounting to 2,000 native trees and shrubs in 500 square metres of restored land along the capital’s polluted river. The project falls under theOtherForest initiative, a nature-based tool for ecological and social regeneration, and was planted using the Miyawaki Technique, a proven Japanese method used to create forests in different climates around the world. Miyawaki forests are dense multi-layered forests, 30 times denser than other manmade forests, thus capturing 30 times more CO_{2} and 30 times more pollution. They can grow up to 10 times as fast as alternatives, and they restore soil health and biodiversity in degraded sites. They become completely self-sufficient after three years, requiring no watering nor maintenance.

Beirut's RiverLESS Forest earned the D&AD Future Impact award in 2019 and the iF Social Impact Prize in 2020, and was featured in the 5th Istanbul Design Biennial.

=== Cultural and Architectural Studies ===
In her project, 51mi + 25km = 13ft, Third Gehry Prize winner and M.Arch graduate Sophie Akoury explores the histories of the Los Angeles River through architectural and archival lenses, drawing parallels between the LA and Beirut Rivers and their shared identities as paved urban waterways.

== Bridges ==
There are currently six bridges that cross the river, connecting Beirut with its suburbs. Starting from north to south, these are:

- Charles Helou
- Armenia
- Yerevan
- El Wati
- Furn el Chebak
- El Basha

Additionally, two highway exits cross the river: one off the Emile Lahoud Highway and one off the Charles Helou Highway.
