= Qarnayel =

Qarnayel Village قرنايل Qernayel, Qornayel, Qarnayel, Kernayel, Karnayel
- Qornayel Village
- Location in Lebanon
- Coordinates: 33°51′16″N 35°43′34″E
- Country: Lebanon
- Governorate: Mount Lebanon
- District: Baabda

Area
  - Total: 8.38 km^{2} (3.24 sq mi)
  - Land: 8.38 km^{2} (3.24 sq mi)
- Elevation: 1,160 m (3,810 ft)

Population
  - Total: 5,500
  - Density: 660/km^{2} (1,700/sq mi)

Qarnayel (Arabic: قرنايل) is the 8th largest village and municipality in the Baabda District of the Mount Lebanon Governorate in Lebanon. The village is located between 1100 and 1600 meters above sea level in the western steep slopes of Mount Lebanon, in the Matn al-A'la area, 36 kilometers to the east of Beirut. The village has a population of nearly 5,500, including a significant Druze community.

== Services ==
With one public high school, one public elementary junior high school, and one private school (Al Ishraq), Qornayel attracts students from neighboring villages. Qornayel also has a hospital (Al Jabal Hospital) making it a health center in the region.

Many grottoes are located in the steep pine-clad slopes above the town.

The village is a major source of pine nuts due to stone pine (Pinus pinea) woods covering the area. Qornayel also produces a variety of fruits and vegetables.

Coal and iron were mined during the 19th century. The coal mine was owned by a British company, Brattle & Hornhill. It closed in 1841 following Ibrahim Pasha’s retreat from Lebanon.

Qornayel is considered one of the most prominent summer villages in Lebanon, in the pre-war years a large number of residents of coastal villages intended to spend the summer in Qornayel. After the war, Qornayel attracted a large number of Gulf tourists who came to Qarnayel to spend the summer vacation, and many of them had owned residential apartments in the village. Qornayel (Qornayel) is a touristic area where you can find pine trees and natural lakes on its top. Qornayel is a famous area for camping in Lebanon.

== Families ==
Among the Druze of Qarnayel, the Hilal are Jumblatti and the Awar are Yazbaki.

== Origin of Name ==
The name is said to have an Aramaic origin QARNA ـ D ـ ILA which translates to " The Summit of God ". The presence of temple ruins in its lands, such as sarcophagi and huge stones in addition to pieces of pottery suggests that the ancient Semites built a temple there. Researchers have considered that the name Qornayel is still preserved in the world heritage, in the name “Cronus”, the Greek god that the Greeks quoted from the Phoenician god: El, who was called the father of the centuries. Thus the name Qornayel, contrary to any jurisprudence, is the full name of the god, in its original Phoenician language, and it became in Greek “Kronos”. On the ruins of the Phoenician temple, the Romans built a temple for their god Jupiter, the ruins of which are still at the southern entrance to the town, in the place known as “Al-Muhawatah,” meaning “the Walled One.” There is no doubt that this name has a connection to its relics.

== Interesting landmarks ==
- Qornayel- Falougha lakes which are a great natural touristic area.
- Qornayel Forest
