= Kfar Silwan =

Kfar Silwan كفر سلوان Kfar Selouane, Kfarselwan, Kfar Silwen
- Location in Lebanon
- Coordinates: 33°51′32″N 35°46′58″E
- Country: Lebanon
- Governorate: Mount Lebanon
- District: Baabda

Area
  - Total: 1,800 ha (4,400 acres)
- Elevation: 1,380 m (4,530 ft)

Kfar Silwan (Arabic: كفر سلوان, also spelled Kfar Selouane, Kfarselwan or Kfar Silwen) is a municipality in the Baabda District of Mount Lebanon Governorate, Lebanon. It is 49 kilometres (30 mi) north of Beirut. Kfar Silwan has an average elevation of 1,380 metres (4,530 ft) above sea level and a total land area of 1,471 hectares. It had 2,736 registered voters in 2010. Its inhabitants are predominantly Maronites and Druze.

== History ==
Kfar Silwan was the ancestral village of the Abu'l-Lama muqaddams (local chiefs), a Druze family affiliated with Fakhr al-Din II (fl. 1590–1633), which later moved to Mtain and Salima and embraced Maronite Christianity. The village later served as the headquarters of the Banu Hatum, a Druze clan. From Kafr Silwan, the Banu Hatum led a peasants' revolt in the early 1790s against the taxation attempts of Bashir Shihab II, the paramount tax farmer of Mount Lebanon and its environs, forcing his troops to withdraw from the Matn area. In 1794 the revolt was suppressed by the forces of the Ottoman governor Jazzar Pasha, the village was destroyed and part of its inhabitants, including the Banu Hatum, migrated to the Hauran.

In 1838, Eli Smith noted Kefr Selwan as a village located in Aklim el-Metn; East of Beirut.

== See also ==
- Druze in Lebanon
- Maronite Church in Lebanon

== Bibliography ==
- Abu-Husayn, Abdul-Rahim (1985). Provincial Leaderships in Syria, 1575–1650. Beirut: American University of Beirut. ISBN 9780815660729.
- Firro, Kais (1992). A History of the Druzes. Brill. ISBN 90-04-09437-7.
- Hourani, Alexander (2010). New Documents on the History of Mount Lebanon and Arabistan in the 10th and 11th Centuries H. Beirut.
- Robinson, E.; Smith, E. (1841). Biblical Researches in Palestine, Mount Sinai and Arabia Petraea: A Journal of Travels in the year 1838. Vol. 3. Boston: Crocker & Brewster.
