= Anis Freiha =

Lebanese writer

Anis Freiha (also spelled Anīs Furayḥah, Freyha or Feiha, 1903–1993) was a Lebanese scholar who wrote extensively about Lebanese traditional village life.

== Life ==
He was born in the town of Ras el Matn, Mount Lebanon, and studied at the American University of Beirut AUB, and at the University of Chicago, where he earned a PhD. He is considered an authority on Lebanese traditional village life and his books contain many descriptions of the origin of village names, traditions and stories, and rich in architectural and detailed description of village artifacts and objects. His novels have inspired various narratives and plays on Lebanon's village culture.

== Books ==
- Isma'a Ya Rida
- The Lebanese Village, a Culture Being Forgotten
- Before I Forget
- Names of Lebanese Villages and their Origins
- New Dictionary of Lebanese Proverbs
