= Michael F. Holick =

American physician–scientist

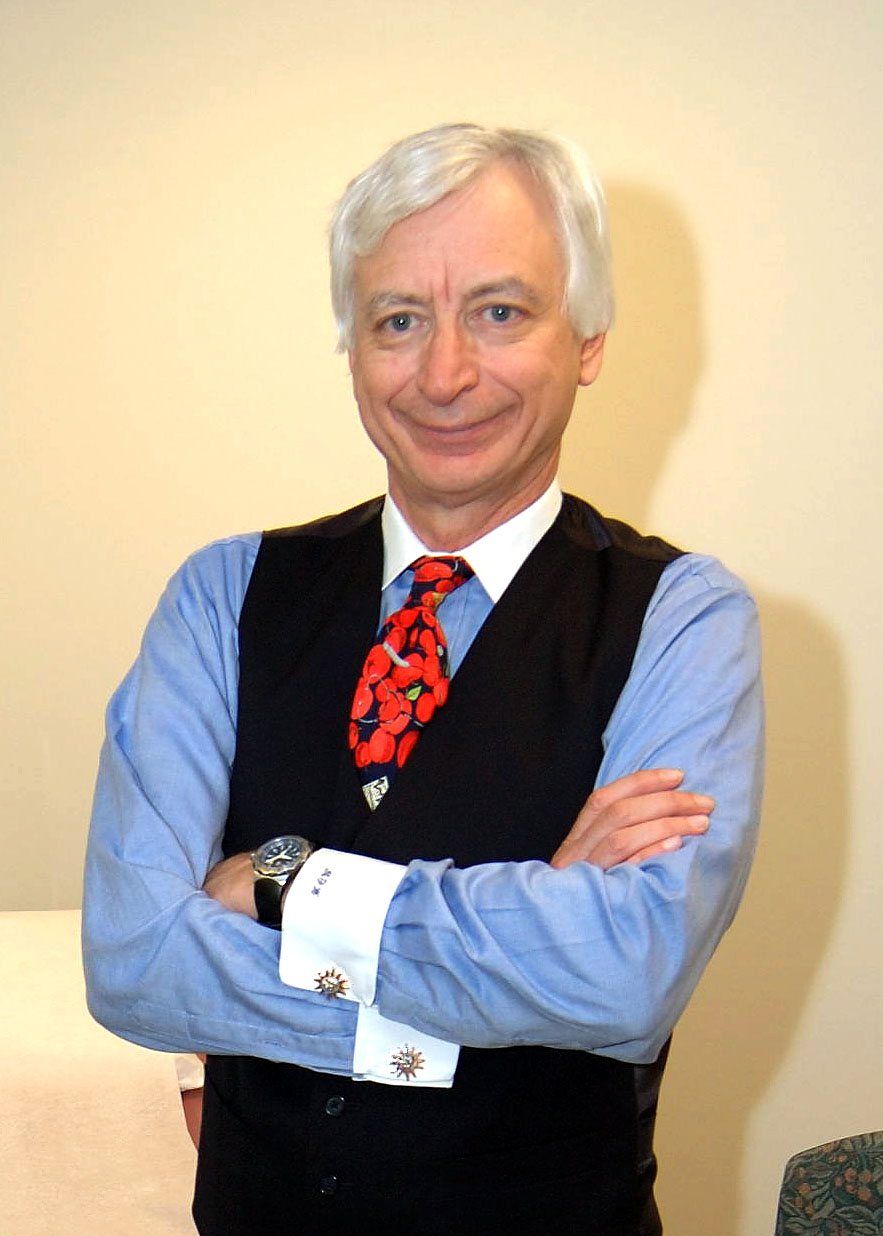
- Born: February 15, 1946 (age 80); Jersey City, New Jersey
- Citizenship: American
- Education: University of Wisconsin–Madison
- Known for: Vitamin D research
- Scientific career
- Fields: Endocrinology, Vitamin D
- Workplaces: Boston University Medical Center
- Thesis: A New Chromatographic System for Vitamin D and Its Metabolites: Isolation and Identification of 1,25-Dihyroxycholecalciferol, the "Probable Tissue Active Form" of the Vitamin in the Intestine (1971)
- Doctoral advisor: Hector F. DeLuca
- Other academic advisors: Heinrich K. Schnoes
- Notable students: Nipith Charoenngam

Michael F. Holick (/ˈhɒlɪk/ HOLL-ik; born 1946) is an internationally prominent physician-scientist, and endocrinologist. He is a professor of medicine at the Boston University Medical Center and editor-in-chief of the journal Clinical Laboratory. As a result of controversies associated with his medical practice, he has been forbidden from treating patients at the Boston Medical Center since 2017.

== Professional activities ==
After earning a Ph.D. degree in biochemistry, a medical degree, and completing a research postdoctoral fellowship at the University of Wisconsin–Madison, Holick completed a residency in medicine at the Massachusetts General Hospital in Boston.

He has been practicing adult and pediatric endocrinology since 1978 and is professor of medicine, physiology and biophysics and director of the Bone Health Care Clinic and the Heliotherapy, Light, and Skin Research Center at Boston University Medical Center. It provides extensive evaluation and treatment programs for children and adults with various metabolic bone diseases including osteoporosis, osteomalacia, stress fractures in young athletic women and men, and minimum trauma and nontraumatic fractures in infants, children and adults with hypermobility syndromes, osteogenesis imperfecta, and Ehlers–Danlos syndrome. He has been director of the General Clinical Research Unit at Boston University for several years.

Holick serves as chair of NASA's "Human Health Countermeasures Element" Standing Review Panel, chair of the Endocrine Practice Guidelines Committee for Vitamin D, and editor-in-chief of the medical journal Clinical Laboratory.

== Academic achievements and research ==
Holick is an author of more than 400 publications about the biochemistry, physiology, metabolism and photobiology of vitamin D and the pathophysiology of vitamin D deficiency.

He has been quoted and his scientific work has been referenced in The New York Times, Forbes, Newsweek, Men's Health, Scientific American and Time.

He wrote several books about the importance of vitamin D and its beneficial health effects to the broad public, and discussed the benefits of sensible and the risks of excessive sun exposure.

As a graduate student, he identified the major circulating form of vitamin D, 25-hydroxyvitamin D_{3}, which is the vitamin D metabolite that is measured by physicians worldwide to determine a patient's vitamin D status. He also identified the active form of vitamin D, 1,25-dihydroxyvitamin D_{3}, as well as other metabolites including 24,25-dihydroxyvitamin D_{3}, 1,24,25-trihydroxyvitamin D_{3} and 25,26-dihydroxyvitamin D_{3}.

As a fellow, he participated in the first chemical synthesis of 1,25-dihydroxyvitamin D_{3} and 1α-hydroxyvitamin D_{3} to treat renal osteodystrophy, hypoparathyroidism, vitamin D dependent rickets type I, and osteoporosis. Furthermore, he elucidated the pathophysiology of hereditary vitamin D-dependent rickets which involves defective vitamin D metabolism, and the pathophysiological mechanisms of X-linked hypophosphatemic rickets.

Holick helped develop the first clinical assays for 25-hydroxyvitamin D and 1,25-dihydroxyvitamin D, determined how vitamin D3 is made in the skin from sun exposure, and established how season, time of day, skin pigmentation, sunscreen use, and latitude influenced this vital cutaneous process.

He established that the skin was not only the organ responsible for making vitamin D_{3} but was also a target tissue for its active form, 1,25-dihydroxyvitamin D_{3}. He determined the extremely inhibitory effects of 1,25-dihydroxyvitamin D_{3} on keratinocyte proliferation and the promoting effects on differentiation, and translated these seminal observations by demonstrating that the topical application of 1,25-dihydroxyvitamin D_{3} and several of its analogs were effective for the treatment of psoriasis.

He demonstrated that macrophages and prostate cells have the enzymatic machinery to produce 1,25-dihydroxyvitamin D_{3}, and established that the extrarenal production of 1,25-dihydroxyvitamin D_{3} may play a crucial role not only in cancer prevention but also in regulating the immune system.

He developed a vitamin D absorption test and demonstrated that vitamin D was bioavailable in orange juice, leading to fortification of juice products in the United States. He also used the test to demonstrate the major cause of vitamin D deficiency in obesity is sequestration of vitamin D in the fat.

He helped perform dose escalation studies establishing how much vitamin D is required to maintain blood levels of 25-hydroxyvitamin D in the sufficient range for adults. These studies also demonstrated that up to 10,000 IU of vitamin D a day for 5 months did not cause toxicity.

== Controversies ==
Holick has been involved in several medical controversies. While at Boston University, he was asked to leave the Division of Dermatology because of his promoting the medical benefits of sun exposure. He accepted research funding for this work from a non-profit tanning bed company, considered by many to be an important potential bias. Barbara Gilchrest, then head of the department at Boston University, called Holick's book "shlock science" and Holick "a poster boy for the tanning industry".

Holick received nearly $163,000 from 2013 to 2017 from pharmaceutical companies, according to Medicare’s Open Payments database, which tracks payments from drug and device manufacturers. The companies paying him included Sanofi-Aventis, which markets vitamin D supplements; Shire, which makes drugs for hormonal disorders that are given with vitamin D; Amgen, which makes an osteoporosis treatment; and Roche Diagnostics and Quidel Corp., which both make vitamin D tests.

Holick has also been criticized by other physicians because of his testimony, defending accused child abusers by asserting that Ehlers–Danlos syndrome is a cause of non-traumatic fractures in infancy (rather than abuse). In one case of a child who had suffered broken bones in which Holick defended the accused parent, the child later went on to suffer severe brain injury, for which the parent, named Robert Marvin Ray, has been indicted.

Since May 2017, Holick has been barred from evaluating or treating children by Boston Medical Center, which subsequently reported him to the Massachusetts Board of Registration in Medicine for "health care facility discipline", but is still allowed to evaluate children who are participating in his research project. Boston University has defended Holick's right to testify in courts, as part of his academic freedom.

Holick has speculated that the dinosaurs may have died of rickets and osteomalacia caused by a lack of vitamin D in reduced sunlight.

A paper on vitamin D to treat COVID-19 has been retracted.

== Awards ==
Holick has been awarded for his contributions to the field of vitamin D research with prizes, including:

- Merit Award from the National Institute of Health
- American Society for Bone and Mineral Research Fuller Albright Award
- Mead Johnson Award
- Osborne and Mendel Award, the McCollum Award
- Robert H. Herman Award from the American Society for Clinical Nutrition
- ACN Award from the American College of Nutrition
- NIH’s General Clinical Research Center's Program Award for Excellence in Clinical Research
- Psoriasis Research Achievement Award from the American Skin Association
- DSM Innovation in Nutrition Award
- Van Slyke Award from American Association for Clinical Chemistry
- Linus Pauling Prize In Human Nutrition
- Delbert A Fisher Research Scholar Award from the Endocrine Society
- American College of Nutrition's Communication Media Award
- Institute of Functional Medicine’s LPI Award 2007

== Selected publications ==
=== Books ===
- Holick, MF (2011). The Vitamin D Solution: A 3-Step Strategy to Cure Our Most Common Health Problems. Plume 1st edition. ISBN 978-0452296886.
- Holick, MF; Dawson-Hughes, B (2010) [2004]. Nutrition and Bone Health. Humana Press. ISBN 978-1617374517.
- Holick, MF, ed. (2010). Vitamin D: Physiology, Molecular Biology, and Clinical Applications (2nd ed.). Humana Press. ISBN 978-1603273008.
- Holick, MF; Jenkins, Mark (2005). UV Advantage (2nd ed.). IBOOKS. ISBN 978-1596879003.

=== Scientific journal articles ===
- Holick, MF (2007). "Vitamin D deficiency". N Engl J Med. 357 (3): 266–81. doi:10.1056/NEJMra070553. PMID 17634462. S2CID 18566028.
- Holick, MF (2006). "Resurrection of vitamin D deficiency and rickets". J Clin Invest. 116 (8): 2062–72. doi:10.1172/JCI29449. PMC 1523417. PMID 16886050.
- Pietras, SM; Obayan, BK; Chai, MH; Holick, MF (2010). "Vitamin D2 treatment for vitamin D deficiency and insufficiency for up to 6 years". Arch Intern Med. 169 (19): 1806–8. doi:10.1001/archinternmed.2009.361. PMID 19858440.
- Biancuzzo, RM; Young, A; Bibuld, D; Cai, MH; Winter, RM; Klein, EK; Ameri, A; Reitz, R; Salameh, W; Chen, TC; Holick, MF (2010). "Fortification of orange juice with vitamin D(2) or vitamin D(3) is as effective as an oral supplement in maintaining vitamin D status in adults". Am J Clin Nutr. 91 (6): 1621–6. doi:10.3945/ajcn.2009.27972. PMC 2869510. PMID 20427729.
- Holick, MF; Binkley, NC; Bischoff-Ferrari, HA; Gordon, CM; Hanley, DA; Heaney, RP; Murad, MH; Weaver, CM; et al. (2011). "Evaluation, treatment, and prevention of vitamin D deficiency: an Endocrine Society clinical practice guideline". J Clin Endocrinol Metab. 96 (7): 1911–30. doi:10.1210/jc.2011-0385. PMID 21646368.
