= Chbaniyeh =

Chbaniyeh الشبانية Shbaniyeh, Ishbaniyya
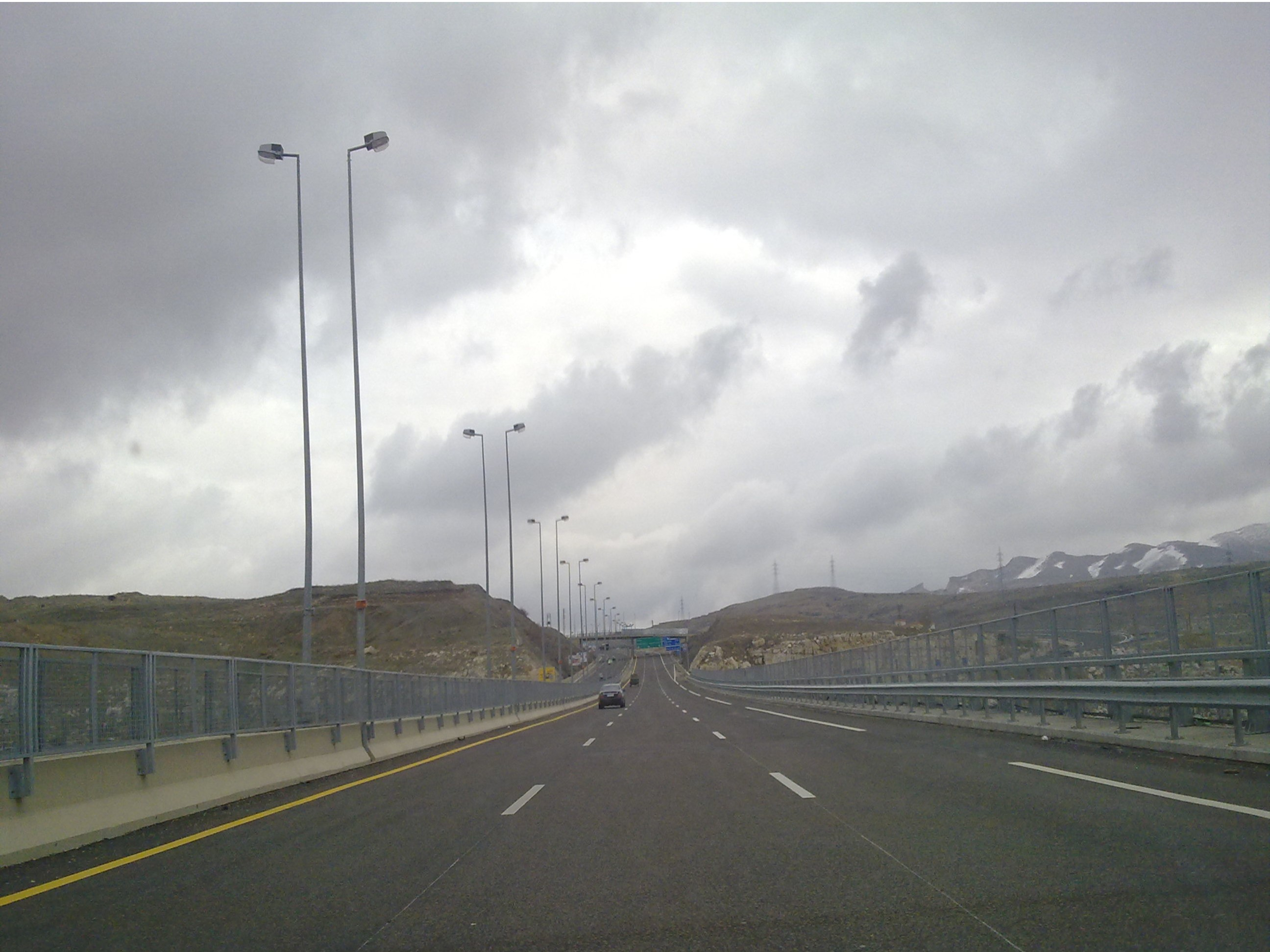
- Chbaniyeh, 2011

- Location in Lebanon
- Coordinates: 33°51′23″N 35°36′45″E
- Country: Lebanon
- Governorate: Mount Lebanon
- District: Baabda

Area
  - Total: 860 ha (2,100 acres)
- Elevation: 485 m (1,591 ft)

Chbaniyeh (Arabic: الشبانية, also spelled Shbaniyeh or Ishbaniyya) is a municipality in the Baabda District of Mount Lebanon Governorate, Lebanon. It is 29 kilometres (18 mi) north of Beirut. Chbaniyeh has an average elevation of 860 metres (2,820 ft) above sea level and a total land area of 485 hectares. It has a religiously-mixed population Maronites, Melkites and Druze.

== Bibliography ==
- Abu-Husayn, Abdul-Rahim (1985). Provincial Leaderships in Syria, 1575–1650. Beirut: American University of Beirut. ISBN 9780815660729.
