= Baabda District =

Coordinates: 33.8347°N 35.542°E

- District
- بعبدا
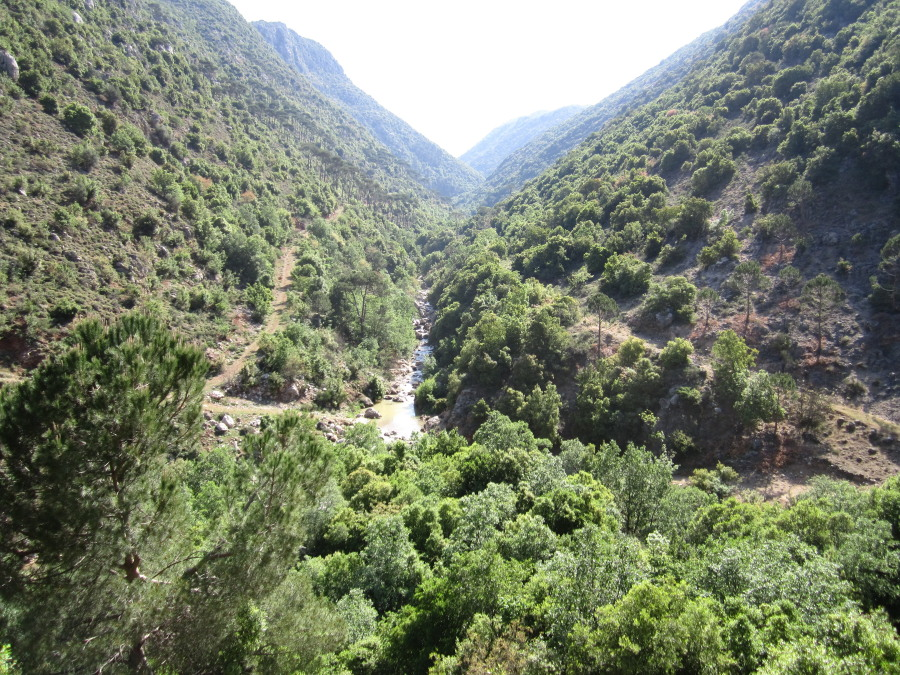
- Baabda District

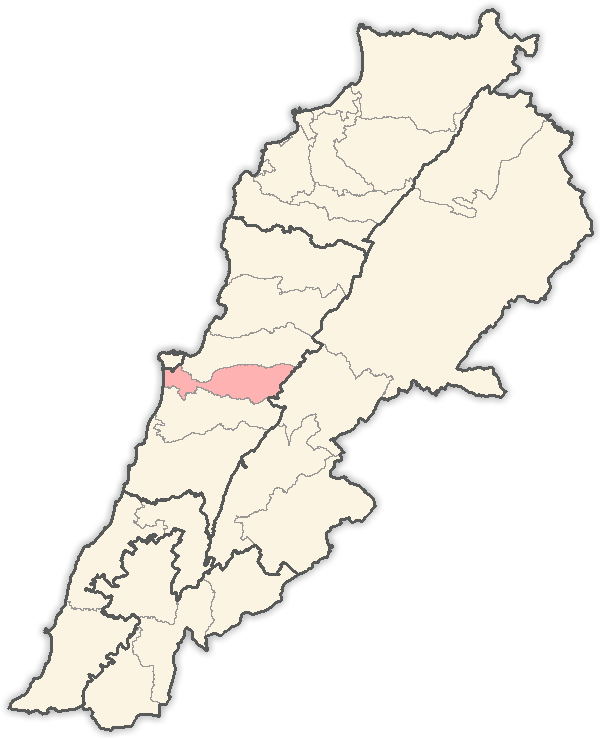
- Location in Lebanon
- Country: Lebanon
- Governorate: Mount Lebanon Governorate
- Capital: Baabda

Area
  - Total: 75 sq mi (194 km^{2})

Population
  - Estimate (31 December 2017): 568,714
- Time zone: UTC+2 (EET)
  - Summer (DST): UTC+3 (EEST)

Baabda District (Arabic: قضاء بعبدا, romanized: Qaḍaʾ Bʿabdā), sometimes spelled B'abda, is a district (qadaa) of Mount Lebanon Governorate, Lebanon, to the south and east of the Lebanon's capital Beirut. The region is also popularly known as "Southern Matn District" (المتن الجنوبي, transliteration: al-Matn al-Janoubi), as distinct from Northern Matn District, (المتن الشمالي; transliteration: al-Matn ash-Shimali). The capital of Baabda District is the city of Baabda.

== Demographics ==
The inhabitants of the Baabda district are mainly Maronite Catholics, Shia Muslims and Druze. Shia Muslims in the Baabda district mostly inhabit the coastal area of the district which lies directly south of Beirut. This area is also known as Dahieh or the southern suburbs of Beirut. The Druze on the other hand, live in the mountainous area further inland.

As of the elections, six seats in the Lebanese Parliament are allocated to Baabda. Three of these seats are allocated to Maronite Catholics, two to the Shi'a Muslims and one to the Druze.

City	Population
Abadiyeh	7,900
Baabda*	9,000
Bourj el-Barajneh*	25,000
Chbaniyeh	1,300
Shiyyah*	17,000
Falougha	3,500
Furn el Chebbak*	17,000
Ghbeireh*	28,000
Hadath*	20,500
Hammana	7,750
Hazmieh*	3,900
Qarnayel	3,600
Kfarshima	6,300
Ras el Matn	8,000
Salima	3,600
Wadi Chahrour	6,700

Note: starred cities are part of metropolitan Beirut.

According to registered voters in 2014:

Year	Christians					Muslims			Druze
Year	Total	Maronites	Greek Orthodox	Greek Catholics	Other Christians	Total	Shias	Sunnis	Druze
2014	51.99%	34.94%	7.83%	5.43%	3.79%	30.38%	23.98%	6.39%	17.22%
2018	51.53%	34.33%	7.72%	5.32%	4.16%	31.21%	24.6%	6.61%	17.24%
2022	51.85%	34.07%	8.14%	5.80%	3.84%	31.55%	24.87%	6.68%	16.60%
2026	50.91%	34.90%	8.91%	4.35%	2.75%	31.44%	25.00%	6.44%	17.65%

Number of registered voters (21+ years old) over the years.

Years	Women	Men	Total	Growth (%)
2009	77,547	74,043	151,590	—N/a
2010	78,360 ▲	74,495 ▲	152,855 ▲	+0.83% ▲
2011	78,754 ▲	75,111 ▲	153,865 ▲	+0.66% ▼
2012	79,525 ▲	75,780 ▲	155,305 ▲	+0.93% ▲
2013	80,809 ▲	76,694 ▲	157,503 ▲	+1.40% ▲
2014	81,519 ▲	77,469 ▲	158,988 ▲	+0.93% ▼
2015	82,421 ▲	78,308 ▲	160,729 ▲	+1.08% ▲
2016	83,178 ▲	79,407 ▲	162,585 ▲	+1.14% ▲
2017	83,998 ▲	80,224 ▲	164,222 ▲	+1.00% ▼
2018	85,040 ▲	81,095 ▲	166,135 ▲	+1.15% ▲
2019	85,904 ▲	81,743 ▲	167,647 ▲	+0.90% ▼
2020	86,678 ▲	82,378 ▲	169,056 ▲	+0.83% ▼
2021	87,197 ▲	82,843 ▲	170,040 ▲	+0.58% ▼
2022	88,106 ▲	83,640 ▲	171,746 ▲	+0.99% ▲
2023	88,495 ▲	83,869 ▲	172,364 ▲	+0.36% ▼
2024	89,095 ▲	84,328 ▲	173,423 ▲	+0.61% ▲
2025	89,614 ▲	84,731 ▲	174,345 ▲	+0.53% ▼
2026	—N/a	—N/a	175,091 ▲	+0.43% ▼
Source: DGCS

== Environment and archaeology ==
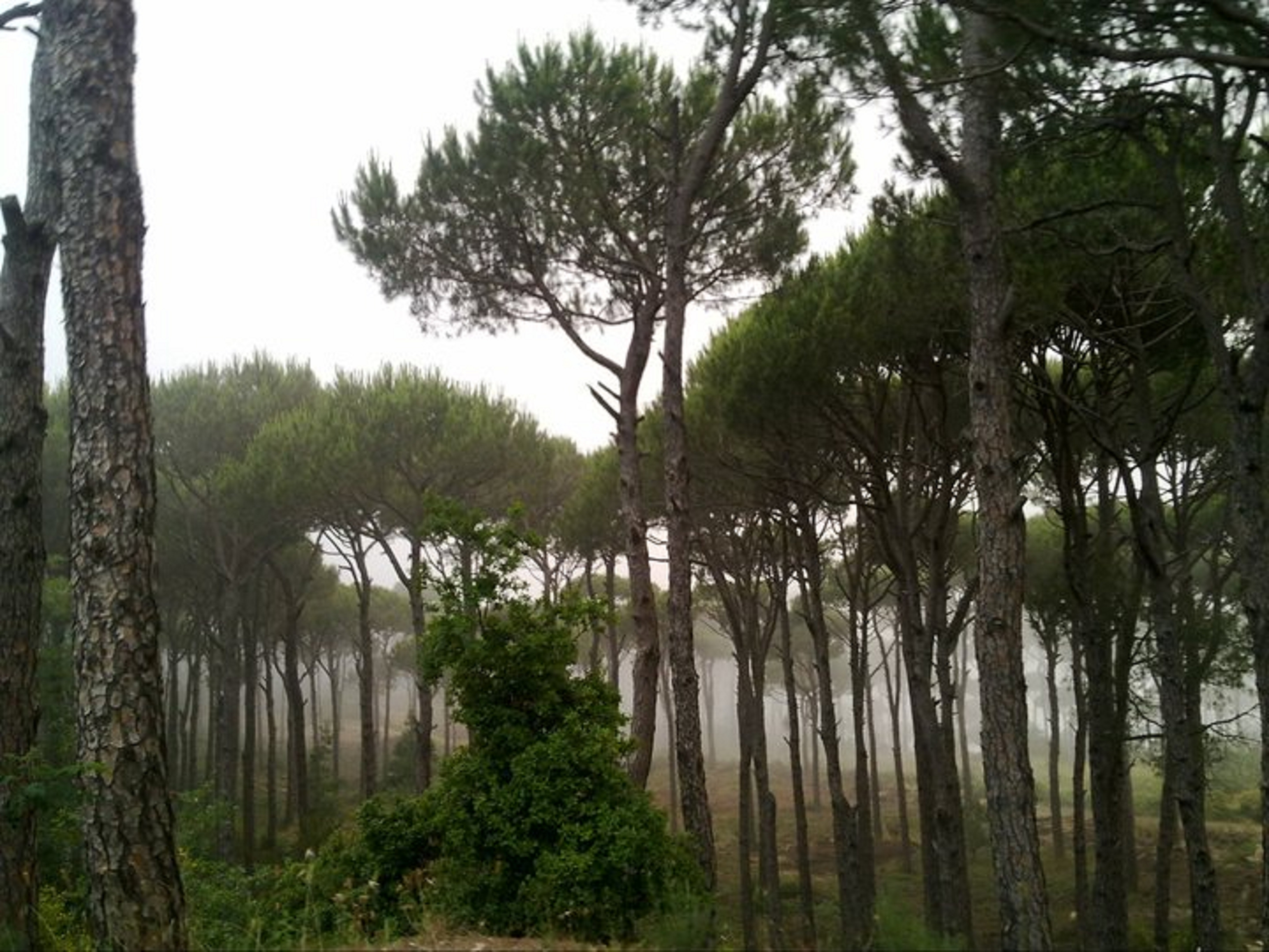
R'as Al-matn pine forest, Baabda District

Baabda District is the source of amber sites dating from 120 million years ago that have uncovered among the oldest lizards including the Baabdasaurus, and also many insects.

== Cities and towns ==
- Abadiyeh
- Ain el Remmaneh
- Araya
- Arbiniyeh
- Baabda
- Baalchmay
- Betchay
- Bmariam
- Btekhnay
- Bourj el-Barajneh
- Chbaniyeh
- Chiyah
- Deir el Haref
- Falougha
- Jouar el-Haouz
- Furn el Chebbak
- Ghobeiry
- Hadath
- Hammana
- Haret Hreik
- Haret el Sitt
- Hazmieh
- Hlaliyeh
- Jamhour
- Kfarshima
- Kfar Silwan
- Khraybeh
- Knaisseh
- Kortada
- Krayyeh
- Ksaibe
- Laylakeh
- Qalaa
- Qarnayel
- Qoubbei
- Ras el-Matn
- Salima
- Sebnay
- Tarchich
- Tohwita
- Wadi Chahrour
- Yarze
