= Clinical Laboratory =

Monthly peer-reviewed medical journal

- Discipline: Laboratory medicine, transfusion medicine
- Language: English
- Edited by: Michael F. Holick

Publication details
- Former names: Das ärztliche Laboratorium, Klinisches Labor
- History: 1955–present
- Publisher: Clinical Laboratory Publications
- Frequency: Monthly
- Impact factor: 1.224 (2015)

Standard abbreviations
- ISO 4: Clin. Lab.

Indexing
- CODEN: CLLAFP
- ISSN: 1433-6510
- OCLC no.: 312440961

Links
- Journal homepage; Online access; Online archive

Clinical Laboratory is a monthly peer-reviewed medical journal covering all aspects of laboratory medicine and transfusion medicine as well as tissue transplantation and hematopoietic, cellular, and gene therapies. It was established in 1955 as Das ärztliche Laboratorium: Zeitschrift für den Laboratoriumsarzt und die ärztliche Praxis. The title was changed to Klinisches Labor in 1991 with the English subtitle Clinical Laboratory. The English title became the sole title from 1997. The editor-in-chief is Michael F. Holick.

== Abstracting and indexing ==
The journal is abstracted and indexed in Chemical Abstracts, Current Contents/Clinical Medicine, Index Medicus/MEDLINE/PubMed, Science Citation Index Expanded, and Scopus. According to the Journal Citation Reports, the journal has a 2015 impact factor of 1.224.

== Editors-in-chief ==
The following persons have been editor-in-chief of the journal:

- Heinrich Schmidt-Gayk (–2007)
- Michael F. Holick (since 2007)
