= Sohat =

Lebanese mineral water brand

- Country: Lebanon
- Source: Falougha
- Type: Still
- pH: 7.9
- Calcium (Ca): 31.3
- Chloride (Cl): 5.1
- Magnesium (Mg): 5.2
- Potassium (K): 0.5
- Sodium (Na): 3.5
- Website: www.nestle-waters.com
- All concentrations in milligrams per liter (mg/L); pH without units

Sohat is a Lebanese brand of mineral water that is the leading brand of bottled water in Lebanon, with a 35% market share. The water is light and crisp with low mineral content and almost no sodium. The brand was acquired by Nestlé Waters.

== Sources ==
Sohat water is bottled from the Falougha source at an altitude of 1,710 meters in Mount Lebanon. The area of the source, which is 100,000 m^{2}, is a protected environment to maintain the purity of the water. The water is purified by passing through various geological layers, starting with the melted snow that seeps through the permeable soil, then reaches a deep and impermeable layer where it is stored before spurting up to the surface through natural fissures.

== History ==
In 1910, archeologist Habib Zoghzoghy rediscovered Ain Sohat while excavating Roman ruins in Falougha.

Mootch & Muck, a New York-based multi-brand water distributor, distributed Sohat in the United States in the late 1980s.

Société des Eaux Minérales Libanaises S.A.L., the producer of Sohat, was founded in 1970. In 1997, the company aided by Nestlé built an $8-million plant with capacity of 19,200 bottles per hour in Falougha. In 1999, Nestlé Group acquired 49% of Sohat as part of its expansion plan in mineral water. In 2001, Lebanon Perrier Vittel, the water division of Switzerland's Nestlé, purchased the remaining 51 per cent of its stake in Sohat. As of January 23, 2001, Société des Eaux Minérales Libanaises S.A.L. operates as a subsidiary of Nestle S.A. The Zoghzoghy family did not release the reason why they sold their share after 50 years of being at the helm of the water-bottling business.

== In literature ==
- In a Villa Far Away by Annabelle Hampton

"Giving up, saying I looked tired and pale, he produced a small bottle of Sohat Pure Water, 'from the springs of Lebanon' according to the label."

- American Psycho by Bret Easton Ellis

"You forgot Alpenwasser, Downunder, Sohat, which is from Lebanon, Qubol and Cold Springs--"
