= Abadiyeh, Lebanon =

Abadiyeh العبادية Aabadiyeh, al-Abadiyah, Abadieh
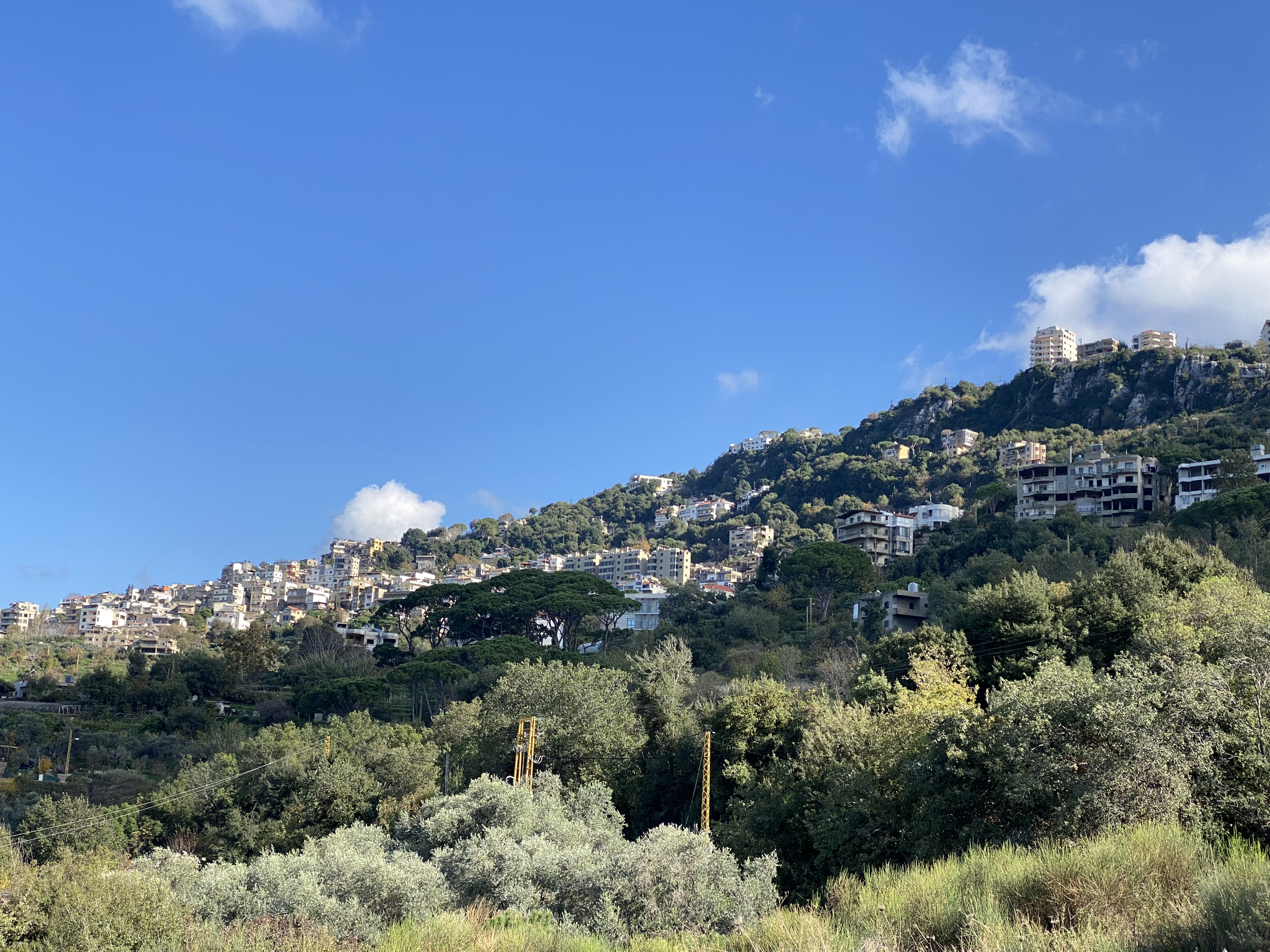
- Abadiyeh in 2023

- Location in Lebanon
- Coordinates: 33°50′9″N 35°37′16″E
- Country: Lebanon
- Governorate: Mount Lebanon
- District: Baabda

Government

Area
  - Total: 916 ha (2,260 acres)
- Elevation: 780 m (2,560 ft)

Abadiyeh (Arabic: العبادية; also spelled al-Abadiyah or Aabadiyeh) is a municipality in the Baabda District of Mount Lebanon Governorate, Lebanon. It is located 16 kilometers east of Beirut. There is one main public highschool in the town, which had more than 500 pupils in 2019. It is the hometown of Lebanese actress Cyrine Abdelnour, Lebanese footballer Zaher Al Indari, former President of Brazil Michel Temer, Lebanese kick boxing fighter Rabih Zahr, and Lebanese Director in Moderna Inc Froncois Nader.

== Geography ==
Abadiyeh has a land area of 916 hectares. Its average elevation is 780 meters above sea level. Neighboring localities include Chouit to the west, Beit Mery to the northwest, Ras el-Matn to the north, el-Halaliyeh to the east, Baalchemay to the southeast, and Aley and Ain el-Jdeide to the south.
