= Ras el-Matn =

Ras el-Matn رأس المتن
- Town
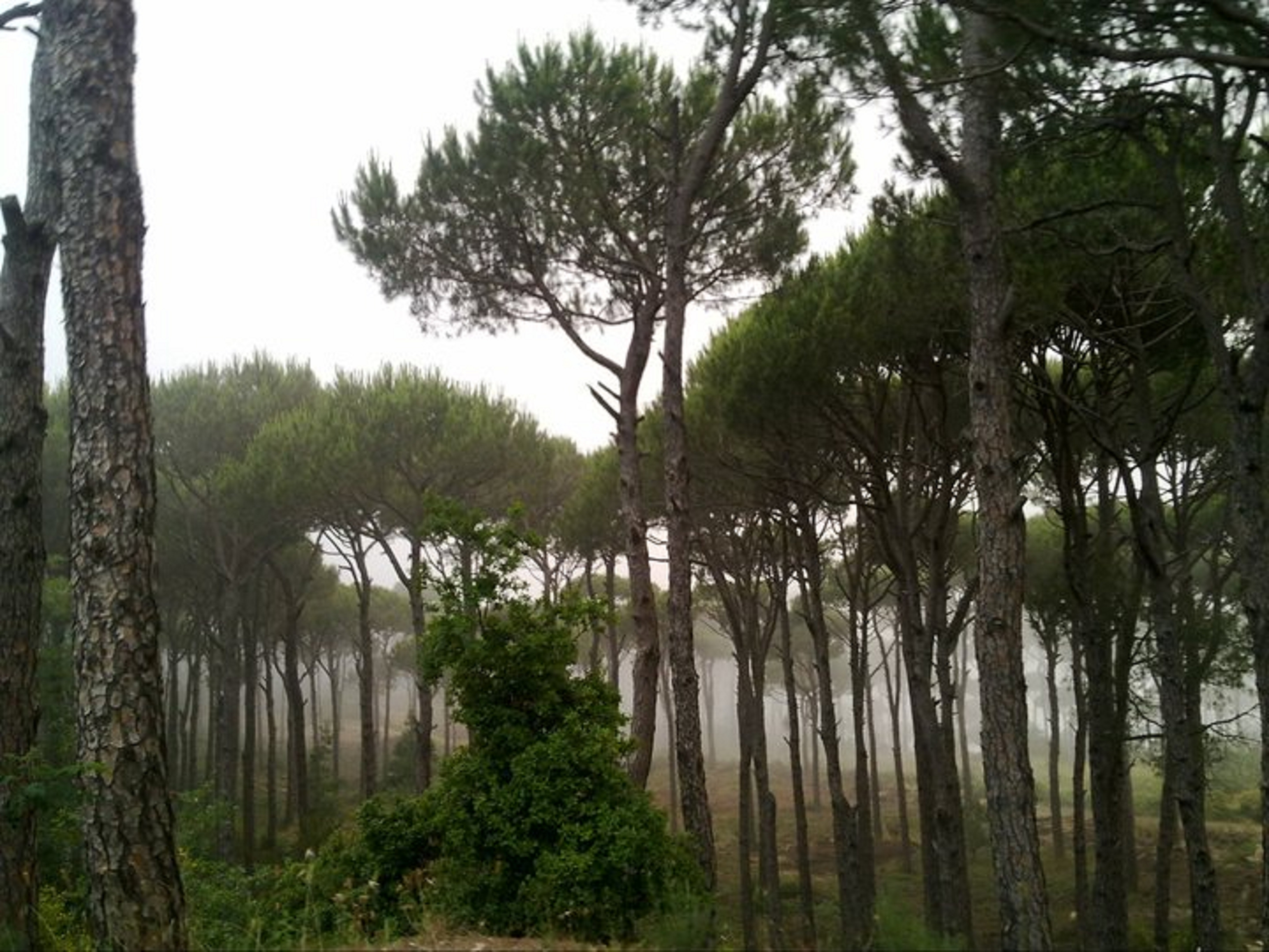
- Pine forest, by Ras el-Matn, 2011

- Location within Lebanon
- Coordinates: 33°51′N 35°40′E
- Country: Lebanon
- Governorate: Mount Lebanon Governorate
- District: Baabda District

Area
  - Total: 13 km^{2} (5.0 sq mi)
- Elevation: 800–1,000 m (2,600–3,300 ft)

Population (2009)
  - Total: 10 000
- Time zone: GMT +2
  - Summer (DST): GMT +3

Ras el-Matn, also spelled as Ras el-Metn or Ra's al-Matn (Standard Arabic: رأس المتن), is a Lebanese town and municipality in the Baabda District of Mount Lebanon Governorate stretching over 1,300 hectares (13 km² - 5 mi²). The town has a population of nearly 11,000 inhabitants who are Druze.

== Etymology ==
The name literally translates "top" (ras) of "the mountain" (el-matn). It describes the town's location as being perched on top of the shoulder of Mount Lebanon. It is well known for the abundance of pine trees there.

== Location ==
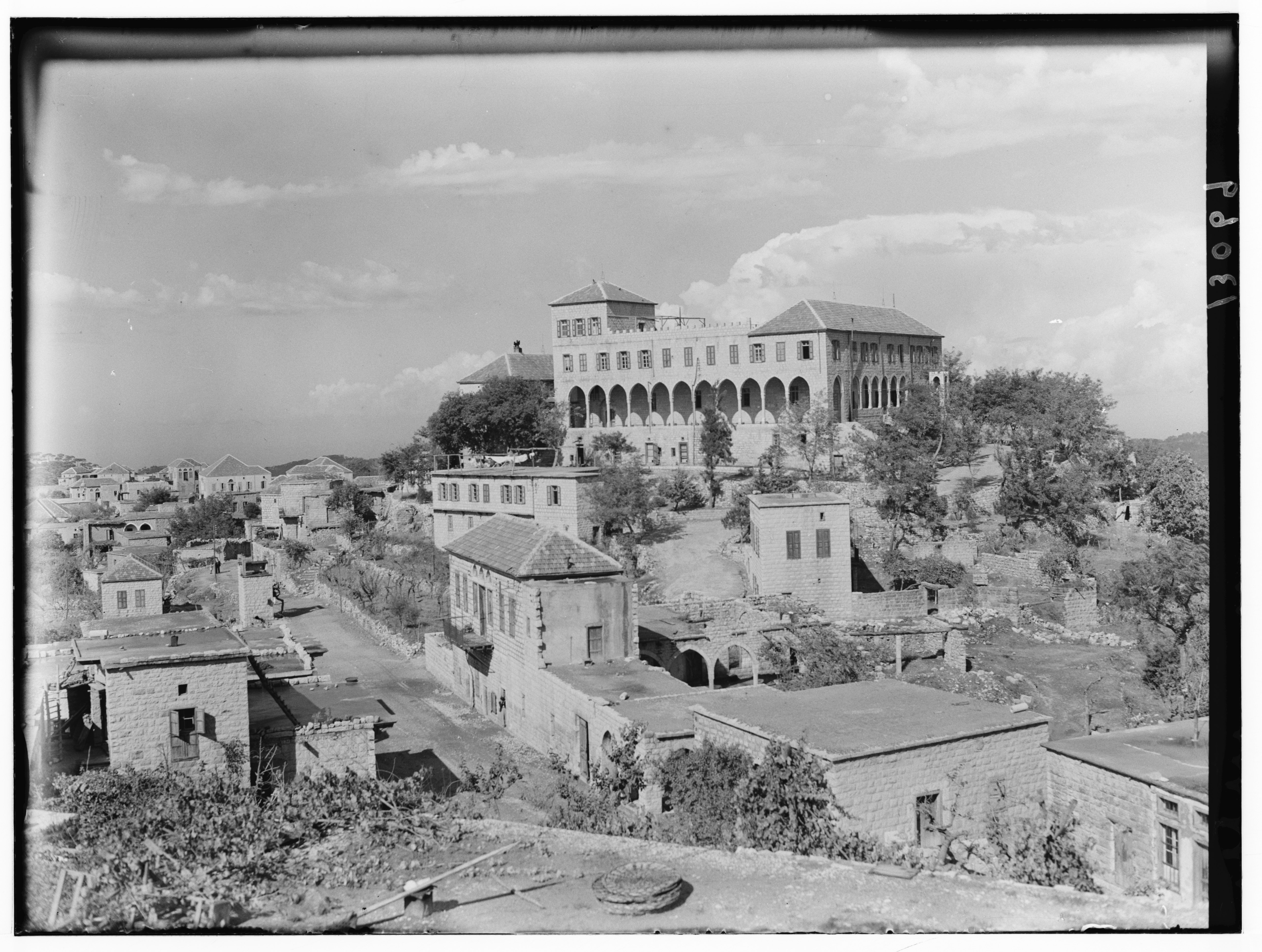
Ras el-Matn, between 1940 and 1946

Ras el-Matn is a town in Lebanon located on the western steep slopes of Mount Lebanon, in the upper Matn (al-Matn al-A'la) section at varying elevation between 800 and 1000 m above sea level. It's known for its panoramic views and pine trees and its location giving a view to the western sections of el-Matn and the Mediterranean Sea. From its heights one can look out across the valley to the towns of Dhour Chweir, Baabdat, Broumana and Beit Mery

The town is 29 kilometers (18.0206 mi) away from the Lebanese capital city Beirut. All roads leading to the town traverse unspoiled landscape of pine-clad hills and rivers, such as the Jaramani river along the Monteverdi road.

There are several possible routes to Ras el Matn:

- Beirut - Mkalles - Mansouriyeh - Monteverdi - Qortada - Ras el-Matn
- Beirut - Joumhour - Araya - Abadieh - Rouweiset Ballout - Mzaira - Deir Khona - Ras el-Matn
- Beirut - Aley - Bhamdoun - Baalishmeih - Chbeniyeh - Hamana - Deir el-Harf - Ras el-Matn

== Population ==
The town has a population of nearly 10,000 inhabitants who are Druze. This villages is notable for its sense of civic pride.

In the municipal Lebanese elections of 2004, it accounted 7149 registered voters of which 4279 actual voters.

Ras el-Matn has two schools, one public school and one private school. 391 students are schooled in the public institution, and 68 are schooled in the private one.

== Heritage ==
Ras el-Matn is the birthplace of Lebanese writer Anis Freiha and the scholar ‘Ajaj Nuwayhid. Ras el-Matn is home to many great athletes, and the schools participate in Basketball and Football leagues.

The most notable building inside the town is the historical Serail of the Lam'iyin princess built in 1775. The huge building later served as a high school. Although damaged and abandoned during the war, one can still appreciate the serail's elegant courtyard and bell tower. Restoration work is planned for the near future.

A natural water spring known as Nabaa Ein el Marj is located found in the lower part of the village. Remarkable for its arched façade built in 1472, the plaque recording its construction is still in place.

Much older, are the ancient tombs carved into the rocky cliffs and headlands of Ras el-Metn, while just below the village the refuge of a holy woman, Sitt Sarah can be found in a rock- scattered field. According to the legend, a rock miraculously opened into a cave to shelter Sitt Sarah as she fled from danger. Finally carved from living stone, the site is an ancient tomb chamber.

Many grottos are located in the steep pine-clad slopes above the town, giving visitors and hikers superb views westwards. Hikers should also ask about the Grotto of Hiskan, which is about a two hours walk from the village.

The town is a major source of pine nuts due to stone pine (Pinus pinea) woods covering the area. The umbrella pines that surround the village are a source of pine nuts, while olives, grapes, figs, apricots and other fruits are cultivated here as well.

Ras el-Matn is approximately 45 minutes away from Beirut and is part of Greater Beirut making it a famous touristic place due to its relatively close distance to the airport and Capital.

=== Awards ===
In September 2004, the Director-General of UNESCO awarded the 2002-2003 UNESCO's Cities for Peace Prize to 10 municipalities which became Laureate Cities, among which is Ras El Metn. The UNESCO's Cities for Peace Prize recognizes municipalities that are strengthening social cohesion, improving living conditions in disadvantaged neighbourhoods and developing genuine urban harmony and diversity.

== See also ==
- Druze in Lebanon
- Greek Orthodox Christianity in Lebanon
