= Salima, Lebanon =

Salima صليما Salimeh
- Location in Lebanon
- Coordinates: 33°52′17″N 35°41′46″E
- Country: Lebanon
- Governorate: Mount Lebanon
- District: Baabda

Salima (Arabic: صَلِيمَا, romanized: Ṣalīmā; also spelled Salimeh) is a municipality in the Baabda District of Mount Lebanon Governorate, Lebanon. There is one public school in the village with 130 students as of 2006.
