= Falougha-Khalouat =

Falougha - Khalwat Falougha
- Location in Lebanon
- Coordinates: 33°50′15″N 35°44′26″E
- Country: Lebanon
- Governorate: Mount Lebanon
- District: Baabda

Area
  - Total: 1,563 ha (3,860 acres)
- Elevation: 1,250 m (4,100 ft)

Falougha - Khalwat Falougha (Arabic: فالوغا) is a municipality in the Baabda District of Mount Lebanon Governorate, Lebanon. The municipality consists of the villages of Falougha and Khalwat Falougha. It is 35 kilometers east of Beirut. Falougha - Khalwat Falougha has an average elevation of 1,250 meters above sea level and a total land area of 1,563 hectares. In 2016, Falougha had 3,400 registered voters while Khalwat Falougha had 600. There is a public school in the village with 150 students as of 2016 and a local hospital with thirty beds. There are seven companies that each employ over five employees operating in Falougha. Falougha has a mixed population of Druze and Christians from the Maronite, Melkite (Greek Catholic) and Greek Orthodox denominations, while Khalouat Falougha's inhabitants are entirely Druze.
