= Bteghrine =

Bteghrine بتغرين
- City
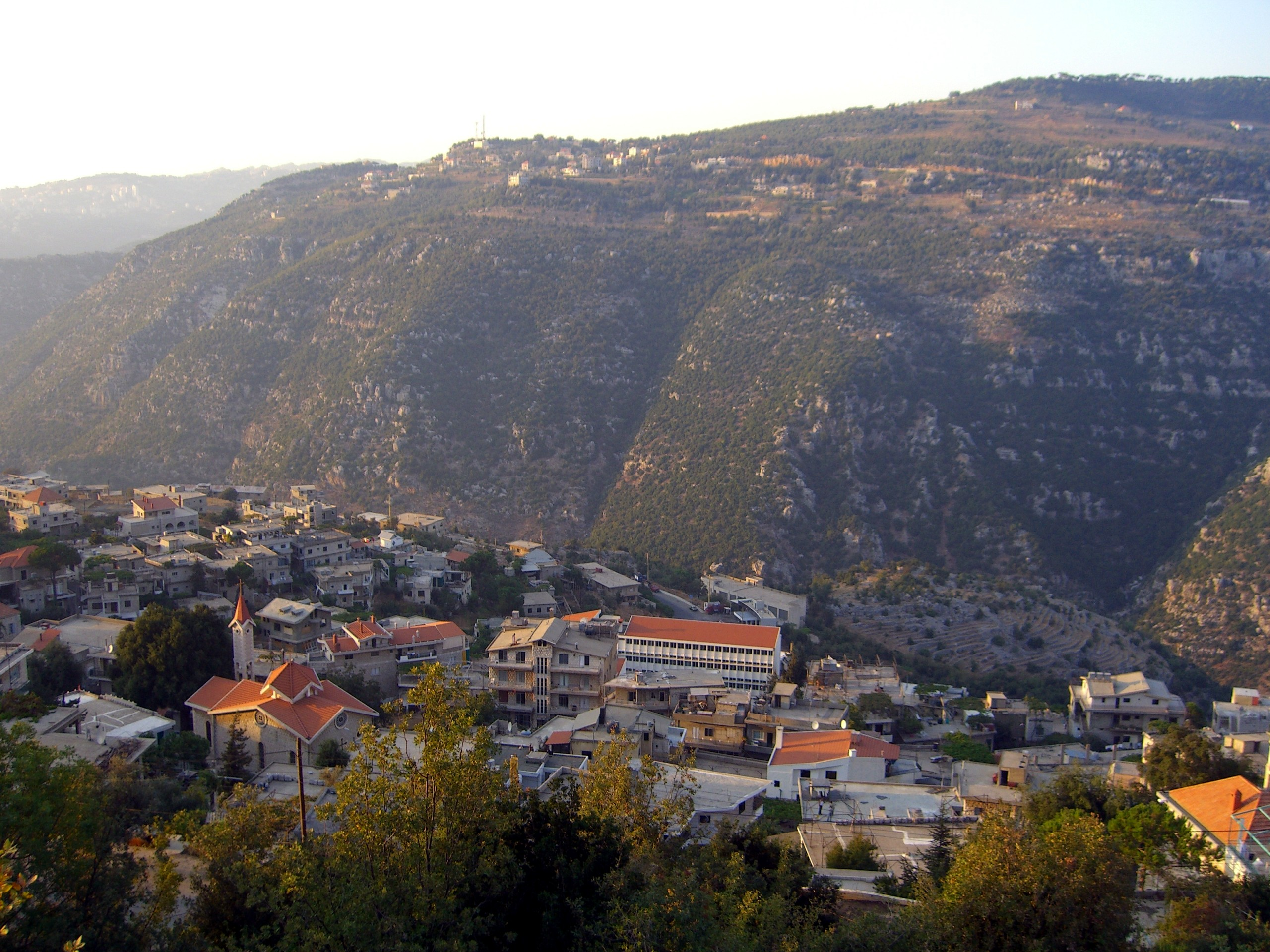
- Overlooking Bteghrine (2005)

- Location within Lebanon
- Coordinates: 33°55′48″N 35°44′42″E
- Country: Lebanon
- Governorate: Mount Lebanon Governorate
- District: Matn District

Government
  - President: Mirna Michel el-Murr
  - Vice President: Emile Murad Saliba
  - Mayors: Nejm Elias Saliba; Jean Jamil Saliba; Jean Mansour Saliba
- Elevation: 950 m (3,120 ft)
- Highest elevation: 1,100 m (3,600 ft)
- Lowest elevation: 950 m (3,120 ft)

Population
  - Total: 12,000
- Time zone: UTC+2 (EET)
  - Summer (DST): UTC+3 (EEST)
- Dialing code: +961
- Family Names: Abou Rjeily; El Murr; Murr; Saliba

Bteghrine (Arabic: بتغرين, romanized: Btighrīn, also spelled Bteghrin and Btighrin) is a municipality in the Matn District of the Mount Lebanon Governorate of Lebanon.

== Etymology ==
The exact origin of the town name Bteghrine is unknown, but possibilities include Place of Warriors, Place of Rocks, and House of the Saddest – references to a large battle in the area around 1290 that resulted in thousands of deaths. Bteghrine was used as a base for the Mardaites during their raids against the Arabs. According to Father Ibrahim Khalil El Murr, this culminated in a battle in 1290 between the local inhabitants and the Arabs, under the command of the Mamluk sultan Barquq, in a valley called “Olon”, later renamed Wadi El Jamajem translating to “The Valley of Skulls” in reference to 17,000 casualties from both sides and their skulls which fell into the valley. Thus, the adjacent town was renamed “Bteghrine” or “Btekrino”, meaning "The House of Sadness", in the Aramaic language since it is where the Mamluks first entered Kisrawan, due to its strategic location at the mouth of the valley, and began their reign of terror and oppression against the local populace.

== Geography ==
Bteghrine is located at 33.93°N 35.745°E. It is bordered by Mount Sannine to the east, Wadi el-Jamajem to the north, Jouar to the west, and Khenchara to the south. The municipality is composed of seven neighborhoods and four outlying areas.

=== Neighborhoods ===
- Haret al-Ain
- Haret al-Dara
- Haret al-Shahara
- Haret al-Shawyee
- Haret al-Ssaha
- Haret al-Wata
- Haret Ali
- Haret al-Asfourieh
- Haret al-FGO

=== Outlying areas ===
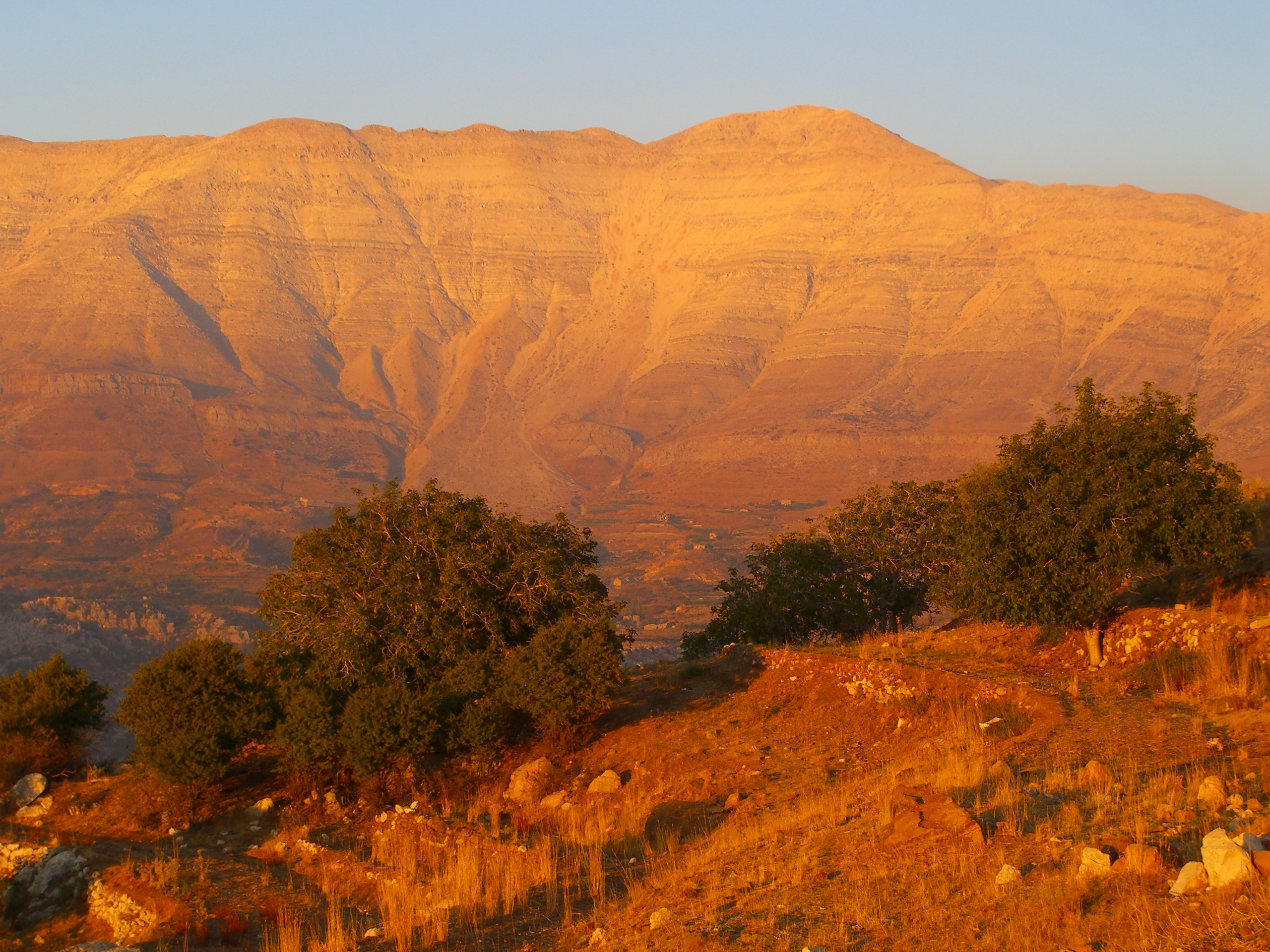
View of Mount Sannine from Zaarour (2005)

- Bsefrine
- Meisree
- Sabourta
- Zaarour

=== Water ===
There are several springs used for both drinking water and agricultural purposes in Bteghrine. The four primary springs are Zaarour, Manboukh, Mir, and Sparta.

== Agriculture ==
Bteghrine is situated on a rocky hillside, but supports a self-sufficient agriculture. Most of the land within the city and the surrounding hills, including the Meisree and Bsefrine districts, was terraced to make it more suited for planting. The most common fruits and vegetables grown in Bteghrine are: figs, grapes, mulberry, plums, apples, peaches, persimmon, pomegranate, cherries, tomatoes, cucumber, parsley, mint, wheat, and beans. Small shops in the town process much of the local produce into arak, molasses, wine, and preserves.

== Economy ==
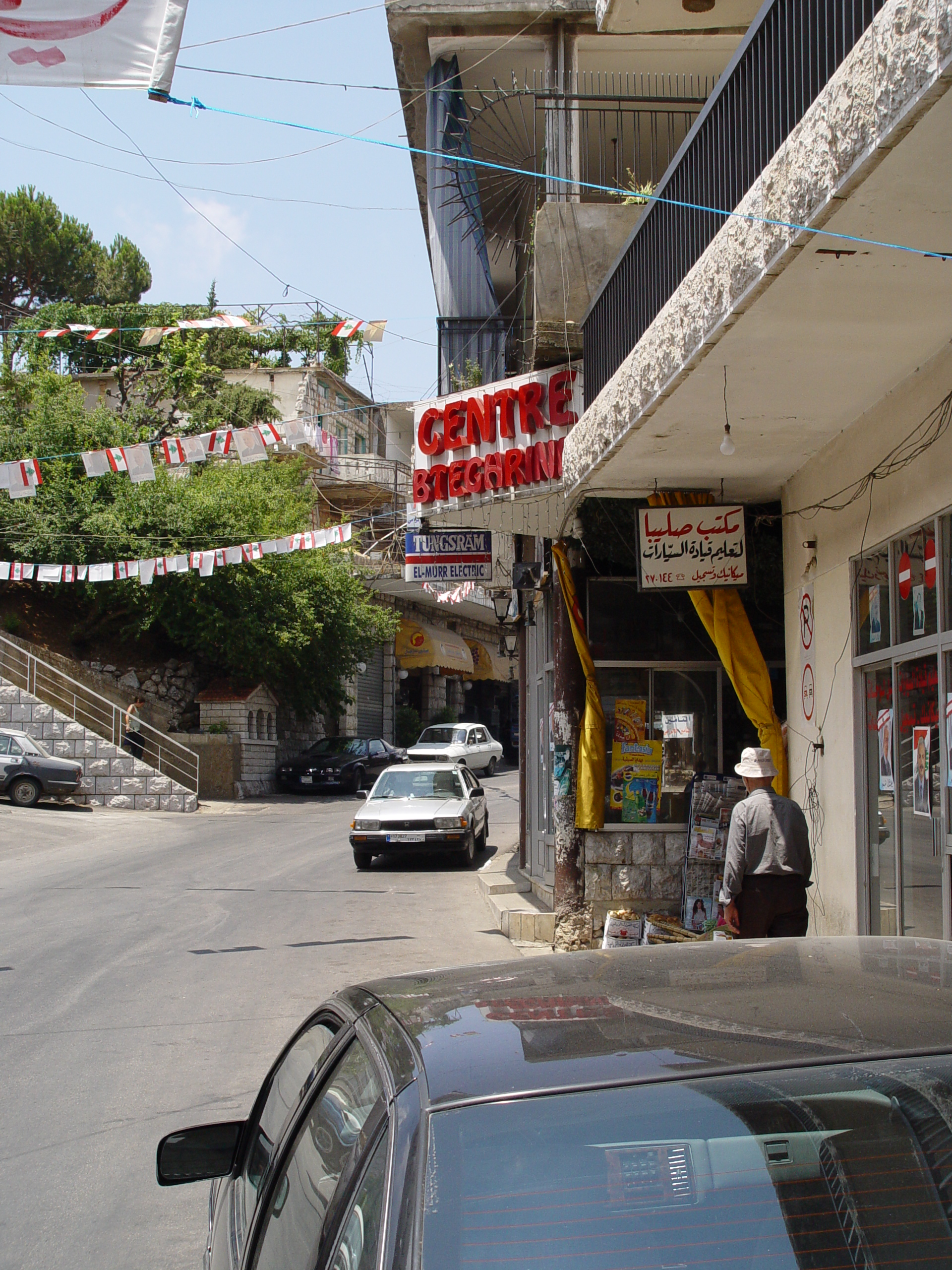
Centre Bteghrine, in downtown Bteghrine (2003)

The FGO Company is the largest trading company in Bteghrine. Additionally, the town has a large number of small shops for blacksmithing, woodworking, car repair and bodywork, leather tailoring, and aluminum manufacturing, and most importantly "snack al hage", that has uplifted the spirit of the citizens of bteghrine.

== Education ==
There is one public school in the town named Bteghrine Public School, and one private Catholic school.

== Religion ==
The vast majority of inhabitants of Bteghrine are Christians, with roughly 80% Greek Orthodox and 20% Melkite Catholic.

=== Churches ===
- St. George – Greek Orthodox.
- St. Michael – Greek Orthodox.
- St. Elias – Greek Orthodox.
- Notre Dame – Melkite Catholic.

== Famous Bteghrineites ==
- Elias Murr – Lebanese deputy prime minister and defense minister
- George Hawi – former secretary general of the Lebanese Communist Party, assassinated June 21, 2005, by a bomb planted under his car
- Greg Simon (Saliba) – current president of the Washington, D.C.–based think tank FasterCures, chief domestic policy advisor to former vice president Al Gore from 1993 to 1997
- Mayy Murr – professor, historian, writer, poet, and political activist
- Michel Murr – former Lebanese minister of the interior
- Gabriel Murr – businessman who founded the MTV media outlet
- Gabriel Murr – former Lebanese minister of the interior (July 26, 1948 – October 10, 1949)
