= LGBTQ liaison officer =

Organisational role

LGBT liaison officers or Gay and Lesbian Liaison Officers (GLLOs) are individuals who work within organisations as a point of contact for LGBTQ issues. They build rapport and trust between an organisation and the communities they serve. LGBT liaison officers ensure that the LGBT community are receiving equitable and culturally competent service provision. LGBT liaison officers also raise issues within organisations that may impact LGBT communities and play a significant advocacy role when developing policies, programs, and services.

== Police LGBT liaison programs ==
LGBT Liaison Officers have been appointed since at least 1962, when San Francisco Police Department appointed Elliott Blackstone as the United States' first liaison officer to the "homophile community". A pioneer of community policing, Blackstone worked within the police department to change policy and procedures directed against the LGBT community, such as entrapment of gay men in public restrooms.

== Notable LGBT liaison officers ==
- Dominick Martorelli: Detective appointed as the LGBTQIA+ Liaison, Office of the Police Commissioner, New York City Police Department (NYPD).
- Danielle Bottineau: LGBT Liaison Officer for the Toronto Police Service.
- Ben Bjarnesen: LGBT Liaison Officer for the Queensland Police Service (since 2010).
- Mickaël Bucheron : LGBT Liaison Officer for the Paris Police Prefecture (since 2019)
- Aditi Hardikar: LGBT Liaison Officer for the White House (November 2014).
- Monique Dorsainvil: LGBT Liaison Officer for the White House after Raghavan's resignation, and until the position was filled by Aditi Hardikar.
- Gautam Raghavan: LGBT Liaison Officer (officially "Associate Director of Public Engagement") for the White House Office of Public Engagement and Intergovernmental Affairs, appointed by the president.
- Richard Socarides: Former LGBT Liaison Officer for the White House (May 1996).
- Brian Bond: Former LGBT Liaison Officer for the White House.
- Bill Kraus: Former LGBT Liaison Officer for Congressman Phillip Burton. Successful in persuading Burton to publicly acknowledge the need for AIDS research.

== Notable LGBT liaison programs ==
- Gay and Lesbian Liaison Unit - Metropolitan Police Department of the District of Columbia (established June 2000).
- Gay and Lesbian Liaison Officers (referred to as GLLO) team in the New South Wales Police Force, for over 25 years.
- Queensland Police Service - LGBTI Liaison Officer Program established in 1997.
- Amsterdam Police Roze in Blauw.
