= Social policy of the Obama administration =

United States social policy (2009–2017)

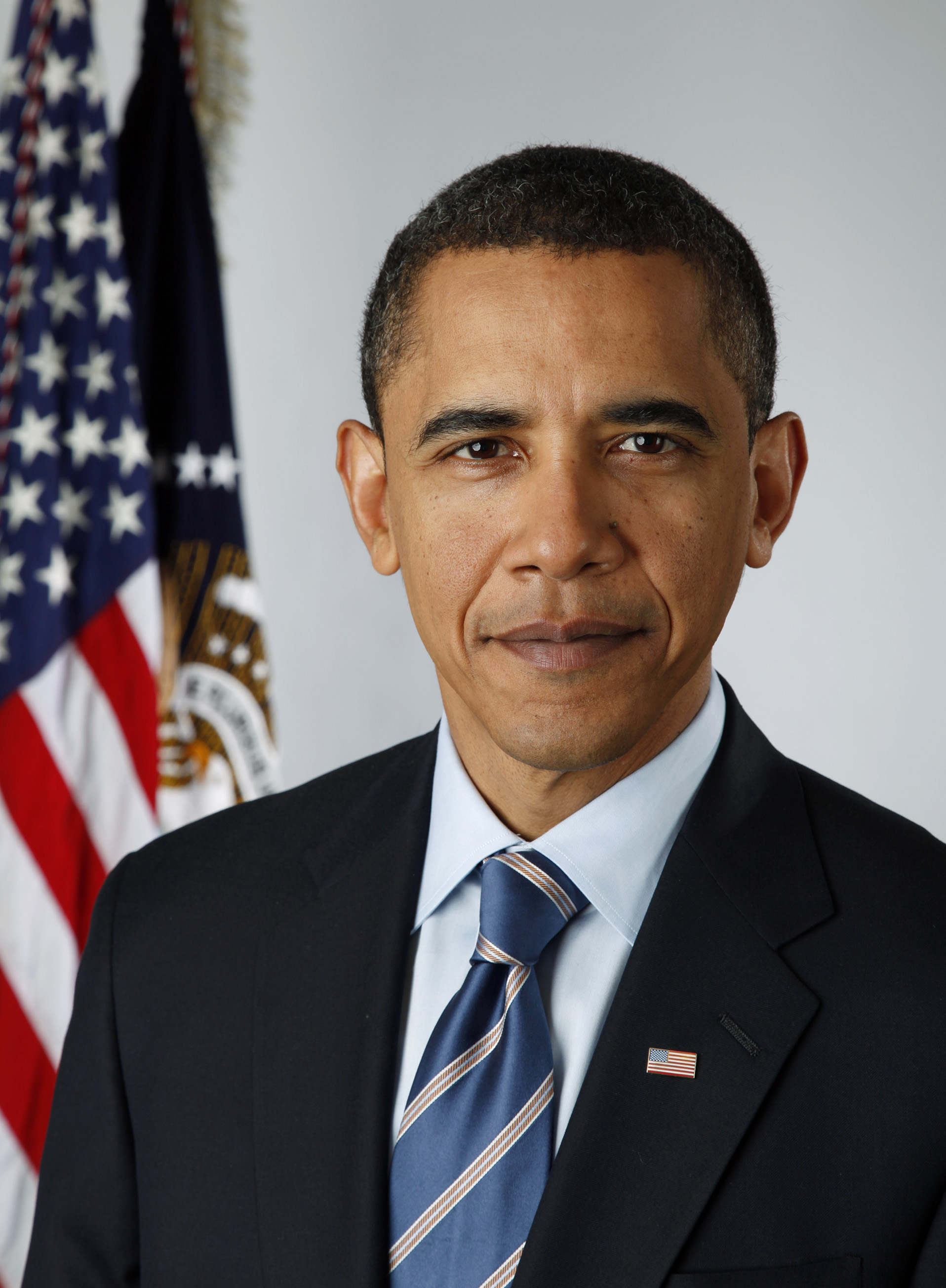
Obama's first term presidential portrait (2009)

The Almanac of American Politics (2008) rated Barack Obama's overall social policies in 2006 as more conservative than 21% of the Senate, and more liberal than 77% of the Senate (18% and 77%, respectively, in 2005).

== Abortion and contraception ==
In his write-in response to a 1998 survey, Obama stated his abortion position as conforming with the Democratic platform: "Abortions should be legally available in accordance with Roe v. Wade." His presidential candidacy was endorsed by several groups advocating for legal abortion, including NARAL Pro-Choice America and Planned Parenthood. In August 2008, in Lake Forest, California, Obama responded to the question as to when life begins, "Whether you're looking at it from a theological perspective or a scientific perspective, answering that question with specificity is above my pay grade."

In the Illinois state legislature, Obama opposed the Induced Infant Liability Act and repeatedly voted against requirements and restrictions intended to stop what opponents label as "born alive" abortions. Obama said that his opposition was because of technical language he felt might have "interfered with a woman's right to choose" and said Illinois law "already required medical care in such situations."

Obama voted against a bill that would have made it a federal crime for anybody other than a parent to accompany a minor across state lines to obtain an abortion.

He expressed displeasure with the Supreme Court ruling that upheld a ban on "partial-birth" abortions saying the ban didn't sufficiently consider the mother's health. He has, however, expressed support of banning some late-term abortions, provided they include exemptions for the mental and physical health of the mother.

During the third debate during the 2008 presidential election, Obama further detailed his stance on abortion:

"[...] there surely is some common ground when both those who believe in choice and those who are opposed to abortion can come together and say, 'We should try to prevent unintended pregnancies by providing appropriate education to our youth, communicating that sexuality is sacred and that they should not be engaged in cavalier activity, and providing options for adoption, and helping single mothers if they want to choose to keep the baby'. Those are all things that we put in the Democratic platform for the first time this year, and I think that's where we can find some common ground, because nobody's pro-abortion. I think it's always a tragic situation. We should try to reduce these circumstances."

Obama voted for a $100 million education initiative to reduce teen pregnancy and provide contraceptives to young people.

== Embryonic stem cell research ==
Obama supports embryonic stem cell research and was a co-sponsor of the 2005 Stem Cell Research Enhancement Act which was passed by both houses of Congress but vetoed by President Bush. Obama condemned Bush's veto, saying, "Democrats want this bill to pass. Conservative, pro-life Republicans want this bill to pass. By large margins, the American people want this bill to pass. It is only the White House standing in the way of progress – standing in the way of so many potential cures." He also voted in favor of the 2007 bill lifting restrictions on embryonic stem cell research that was passed but was also vetoed by President Bush.

On March 9, 2009, President Obama signed Executive Order 13505, Allowing "responsible, scientifically worthy human stem cell research, including human embryonic stem cell research, to the extent permitted by law". This executive order also served to revoke Executive Order 13435, signed on June 20, 2007, by President Bush.

== Disability rights ==
Obama was the only Democratic presidential candidate to issue an unsolicited statement expressing his views on disability community issues. For example, he stated his intention to sign the UN Convention on the Rights of Persons with Disabilities, and expressed his support of the ADA Restoration Act.

== LGBTQ rights ==
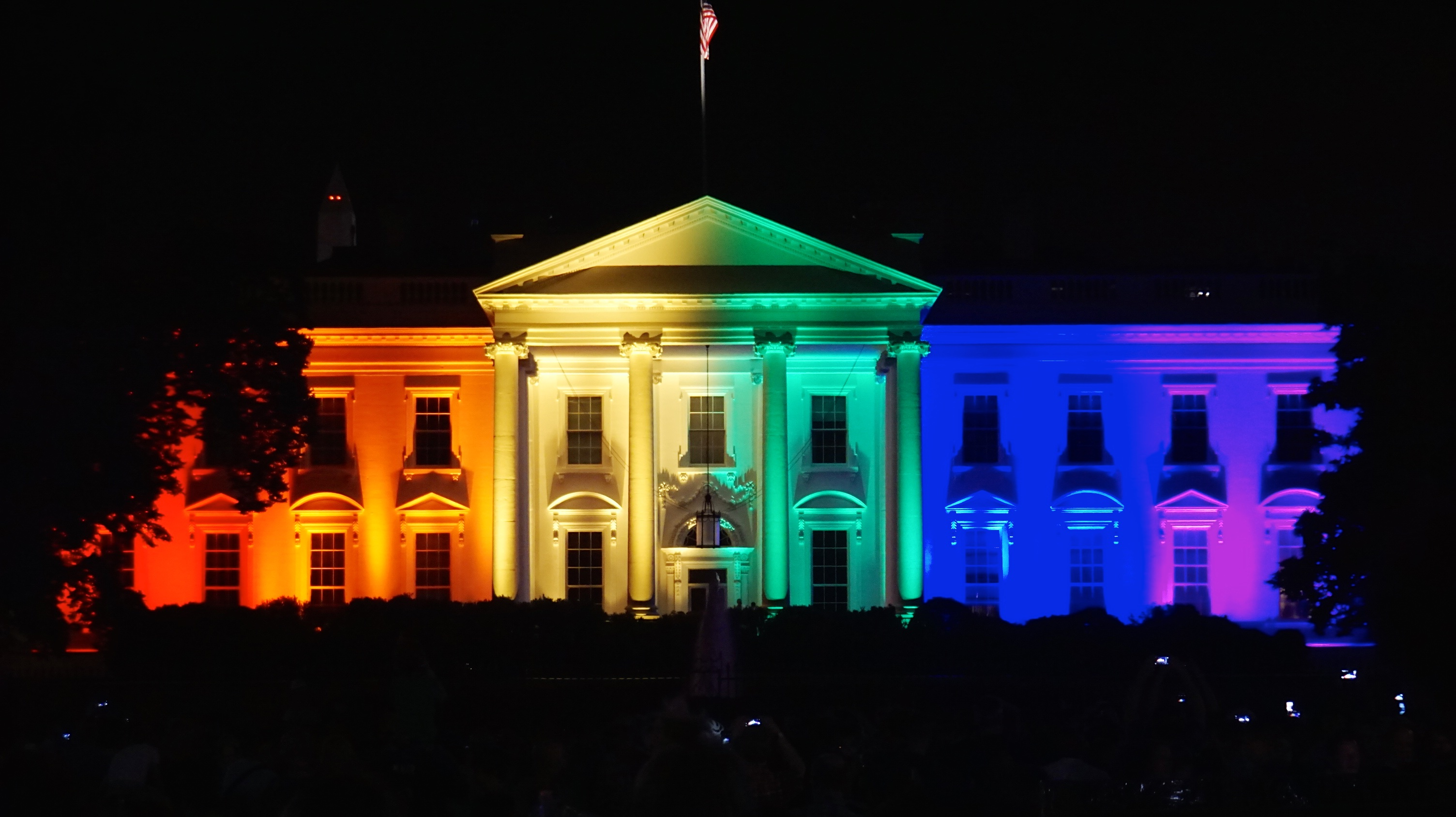
The White House was illuminated in rainbow colors on the evening of the Supreme Court same-sex marriage ruling.

On March 15, 2007, Obama stated, "I do not agree...that homosexuality is immoral." During the July 23, 2007, CNN/YouTube debate, he further stated, "... we've got to make sure that everybody is equal under the law. And the civil unions that I proposed would be equivalent in terms of making sure that all the rights that are conferred by the state are equal for same-sex couples as well as for heterosexual couples." Obama supports expanding the protections afforded by hate crimes statutes to cover crimes committed against individuals because of sexual orientation or gender identity. He also called for full equality for gay people during his second inaugural address on January 21, 2013, saying, "Our journey is not complete until our gay brothers and sisters are treated like anyone else under the law — for if we are truly created equal, then surely the love we commit to one another must be equal as well." This was the first time that a president mentioned gay rights or the word "gay" in an inaugural address.

=== LGBTQ in the military ===
He also stated his opposition to the U.S. military's "Don't ask, don't tell" policy, and signed a bill repealing it.

=== LGBTQ and hate crimes ===
On October 28, 2009, Obama signed the Matthew Shepard and James Byrd, Jr. Hate Crimes Prevention Act, which added gender, sexual orientation, gender identity, and disability to the federal hate crimes law.

=== LGBTQ and anti-discrimination laws ===
Obama has said that he would sign into law the Employment Non-Discrimination Act, which – if passed – would prohibit discrimination in hiring and employment on the basis of sexual orientation or gender identity.

On July 21, 2014, Obama signed Executive Order 13672, adding "gender identity" to the categories protected against discrimination in hiring in the federal civilian workforce and both "sexual orientation" and gender identity" to the categories protected against discrimination in hiring and employment on the part of federal government contractors and sub-contractors.

=== LGBTQ adoption ===
Obama has said that he supports same-sex couples adopting children. Obama extended the Family and Medical Leave Act of 1993 to cover employees taking unpaid leave to care for the children of same-sex partners.

=== LGBTQ and religion ===
Obama was criticized for inviting Reverend Donnie McClurkin, Mary Mary, and Reverend Hezekiah Walker – who all have a history of making anti-gay remarks – to participate in a three-day gospel music campaign tour called "Embrace the Courage", as part of Obama's "40 Days of Faith and Family" campaign in South Carolina. The Obama campaign responded to criticism in a press release, saying, "I strongly believe that African Americans and the LGBTQ community must stand together in the fight for equal rights. And so I strongly disagree with Reverend McClurkin's views and will continue to fight for these rights as president of the United States to ensure that America is a country that spreads tolerance instead of division." For events held on Sunday, October 28, 2007, Obama added Reverend Andy Sidden, an openly gay pastor.

=== LGBTQ appointees ===
Sharon Lubinski, the first openly gay woman in her position, was formally nominated the U.S. marshal for the Minnesota district by President Obama in October 2009 and then confirmed by the Senate in December of that year. On January 4, 2010, Amanda Simpson was appointed by Obama the senior technical advisor to the U.S. Department of Commerce, being possibly the first transgender person appointed to a government post by any US president. Monique Dorsainvil has served as the deputy director of advance and special events and director of planning and events for public engagement and intergovernmental affairs before accepting the position of the White House's LGBT liaison in 2014.

=== Same-sex marriage ===
Obama supported legalizing same-sex marriage when he first ran for the Illinois Senate in 1996. Also, he was undecided about legalizing same-sex marriage when he ran for re-election to the Illinois Senate in 1998. He supported civil unions but not same-sex marriage when he ran for the U.S. Senate in 2004 and for U.S. president in 2008. Obama voted against the Federal Marriage Amendment, which would have defined marriage as the union of one man and one woman. However, in a 2008 interview, he stated that he personally believed that marriage was "between a man and a woman" and that he was "not in favor of gay marriage." He supported civil unions that would establish legal standing equal to that of marriage for same-sex couples, but believed that decisions regarding the definition of the word "marriage" should be left to the states.

In December 2008, Obama called for repealing the federal Defense of Marriage Act (DOMA).

On May 15, 2008, in a statement in response to the ruling of the California Supreme Court, Obama announced his opposition to Proposition 8, an initiative measure proposed for the 2008 California General Election ballot that would amend the California Constitution to define the word "marriage" as the union of a man and a woman. In a letter that he read to the Alice B. Toklas LGBTQ Democratic Club on June 29, 2008, Obama reiterated his opposition to the proposed amendment, stating that he supported the extension of "fully equal rights and benefits to same-sex couples under both state and federal law."

In August 2010, Obama reiterated that he remained opposed to gay marriage.

On May 9, 2012, Obama told an interviewer that he supported same-sex marriage. He was the first sitting U.S. president to do so. He stated:

... over the course of several years as I have talked to friends and family and neighbors when I think about members of my own staff who are in incredibly committed monogamous relationships, same-sex relationships, who are raising kids together, when I think about those soldiers or airmen or Marines or sailors who are out there fighting on my behalf and yet feel constrained, even now that Don't Ask Don't Tell is gone, because they are not able to commit themselves in a marriage, at a certain point I've just concluded that for me personally it is important for me to go ahead and affirm that I think same sex couples should be able to get married.

On March 1, 2013, Obama, speaking about Hollingsworth v. Perry, the U.S. Supreme Court case about Proposition 8, he said:

When the Supreme Court asks do you think that the California law, which doesn't provide any rationale for discriminating against same-sex couples other than just the notion that, well, they're same-sex couples -- if the Supreme Court asks me or my attorney general or solicitor general, 'Do we think that meets constitutional muster?' I felt it was important for us to answer that question honestly. And the answer is no.

The administration's brief did not describe all state bans on same-sex marriage unconstitutional, but argued that the proper standard to apply to laws that use sexual orientation as a category is "heightened scrutiny", which legal observers say no state ban could survive.

In October 2014, President Obama told an interviewer, "Ultimately, I think the Equal Protection Clause does guarantee same-sex marriage in all fifty states". He praised the way the U.S. Supreme Court had addressed the issue, saying, "There have been times where the stars were aligned and the Court, like a thunderbolt, issues a ruling like Brown v. Board of Education, but that's pretty rare. And, given the direction of society, for the Court to have allowed the process to play out the way it has may make the shift less controversial and more lasting."

=== Conversion therapy ===
In April 2015, Obama condemned the practice of conversion therapy in response to a petition calling for the practice to be banned.

=== Sex education ===
As an Illinois State Senator, Obama supported Senate bill 0099 for "age and developmentally appropriate" sex education, which would have allowed parents to choose to withdraw their children from the classes. The bill was endorsed by the Illinois Parent Teacher Association, the Illinois State Medical Society, the Illinois Public Health Association, and the Illinois Education Association. In a debate in 2004, when questioned by Alan Keyes about what kind of sex education was "age appropriate" for kindergarteners, Obama said, "I'll give you an example, because I have a six-year-old daughter and a three-year-old daughter, and one of the things my wife and I talked to our daughter about is the possibility of somebody touching them inappropriately, and what that might mean. And that was included specifically in the law, so that kindergarteners are able to exercise some possible protection against abuse...." In 2007, in response to a similar attack from Mitt Romney, an Obama spokesperson stated his position that communities should determine the curriculum. The Illinois bill did not call for addressing all sex-related issues in kindergarten classes, and Obama has said that he "does not support teaching explicit sex education to children in kindergarten."

=== HIV ===
Obama has encouraged Democrats to reach out to evangelicals and other religious groups. In December 2006, he joined Sen. Sam Brownback (R-KS) at the "Global Summit on AIDS and the Church" organized by church leaders Kay and Rick Warren. Together with Warren and Brownback, Obama took an HIV test, as he had done in Kenya less than four months earlier. He encouraged "others in public life to do the same" and not be ashamed of it. Addressing over 8,000 United Church of Christ members in June 2007, Obama challenged "so-called leaders of the Christian Right" for being "all too eager to exploit what divides us."

As president, Obama lifted a travel ban that previously prohibited HIV-positive people from entering the United States.

== Drugs ==
In May 2008, a campaign spokesman for presidential candidate Obama told the San Francisco Chronicle that he would end DEA raids on medical marijuana suppliers in states with their own laws. President Obama's Attorney General, Eric Holder, said in March 2009 that the DEA would only raid medical marijuana suppliers which violated both state and federal laws. However, by April 2012, the Obama administration was exceeding the Bush administration's number of raids on medical marijuana, including a high-profile raid of Oaksterdam University. Legislators from five states sent an open letter to the Obama administration urging them to stop interfering with state law-abiding marijuana dispensaries.

In 2014, Obama said that pot is not more dangerous than alcohol.

== Healthcare ==
In 2010, Obama signed the Affordable Care Act.

== Environmental policy and record ==
Addressing global warming, Obama stated:

The issue of climate change is one that we ignore at our own peril. There may still be disputes about exactly how much is naturally occurring, but what we can be scientifically certain of is that our continued use of fossil fuels is pushing us to a point of no return. And unless we free ourselves from a dependence on these fossil fuels and chart a new course on energy in this country, we are condemning future generations to global catastrophe.

Obama has pledged to cut greenhouse gas emissions by 80% below 1990 levels by 2050 by creating a market-based cap-and-trade system. He also has planned to improve air and water quality through reduced carbon emissions.

Obama worked as a member of the US Senate Committee on Environment and Public Works during the 109th Congress. During the presidential campaign, he rejected John McCain's proposed suspension of federal gas taxes, claiming that it would hurt consumers, hinder highway construction, and endanger jobs. Obama criticized the idea of a gas tax "holiday" as a ploy by his rivals "designed to get them through an election" and not actually help "struggling consumers".

As president, Obama signed the Omnibus Public Land Management Act of 2009 which aimed to protects large areas of wilderness across America.

Obama signed the Microbead-Free Waters Act of 2015 which banned the use of the plastic particles in products.

In 2016, Obama signed the bipartisan Frank R. Lautenberg Chemical Safety for the 21st Century Act which was the first overhaul of the 1976 Toxic Substances Control Act.

Obama's EPA did face criticism for causing the 2015 Gold King Mine waste water spill. In January 2017, the last month of Obama's second term, the agency declined to compensate anyone for the spill.

== Racial issues ==
Obama opposes offering reparations to the descendants of slaves. "I have said in the past – and I'll repeat again – that the best reparations we can provide are good schools in the inner city and jobs for people who are unemployed," Obama said. An apology for slavery would be appropriate but not particularly helpful in improving the lives of African Americans, he said. Reparations could also be a distraction, Obama said. "I consistently believe that when it comes to whether it's Native Americans or African-American issues or reparations, the most important thing for the U.S. government to do is not just offer words, but offer deeds," Obama told a meeting in Chicago in July 2008.

Obama's administration offered a brief in support of affirmative action in March 2010 vis-à-vis a court case seeking to challenge Grutter v. Bollinger and the legality of "race-conscious" college admissions.

Following the not guilty verdict in the George Zimmerman trial, President Obama gave a 20-minute speech on July 19, 2013, in which he addressed the killing of Trayvon Martin, racial profiling, as well as the state of race relations in the United States.

=== Native Americans ===
Obama has stated, "The bond that I would like to create between an Obama administration and the [Native American] nations all across this country...is something that is going to be a top priority." Obama added that "few have been ignored by Washington for as long as native Americans – the first Americans" and that "too often Washington has paid lip service to working with tribes while taking a one-size-fits-all approach" and promised "that will change when I am president".

Obama was given honorary membership into a Native American tribe, the Crow Nation. At a private adoption ceremony, Obama was given the Crow name "One Who Helps People Throughout the Land".

== Law enforcement and justice ==
Obama voted in favor of the 2006 version of the USA PATRIOT Act. He voted against the Military Commissions Act of 2006 and later voted to restore habeas corpus to those detained by the U.S. (which had been stripped by the Military Commissions Act). He has advocated closing the Guantanamo Bay detention camp, but has not supported two specific bills that would have done so. Obama still opposes the use of torture and used to oppose warrantless domestic wiretaps by the U.S. He voted against the Flag Desecration Amendment in 2006, arguing that flag burning didn't justify a constitutional amendment, but said that he would support a law banning flag burning on federal property. As of August 8, 2008, the ACLU has given Obama a score of 80% on civil liberty issues for the 110th Congress U.S. Senate.

=== Guantanamo Bay ===
As president, Obama made repeated comments to close Guantanamo Bay detention camp.

His first attempt was on January 22, 2009, in which he signed an executive order.

In 2015, the administration repeated its goal to close Guantanamo.

In his final year in office, Obama urged Congress to pass a bill closing Guantanamo, which was not successful.

=== USA PATRIOT Act ===
As noted above, Obama voted to reauthorize the USA PATRIOT Act, which extended the Act, but with some amendments. Such amendments would clarify the rights of an individual who has received FISA orders to challenge nondisclosure requirements and to refuse disclosure of the name of their attorney.

He voted against extending the USA PATRIOT Act's Wiretap Provision on March 1, 2006. This bill would give the FBI the authority to conduct "roving wiretaps" and access to business records. Voting against this bill would prolong the debate, keeping the USA PATRIOT Act provisional whereas voting for this bill would extend the USA PATRIOT Act as permanent.

As president, Obama signed a renewal of the USA PATRIOT Act in 2010.

Obama then signed another renewal of the USA PATRIOT Act in 2011 while on a trip in Europe.

In 2015, Obama signed the USA Freedom Act which, along with reinforcing the powers of the NSA, included the renewal of certain parts of the USA PATRIOT Act.

=== Warrantless wiretaps ===
Obama had previously opposed legislation that granted legal immunity for telecommunications companies that helped the Bush administration to conduct wiretaps without warrants but later voted in favor of a compromise bill that included such provisions.

=== Domestic Surveillance ===
In 2013, Edward Snowden disclosed documents that showed the extent of the NSA collecting information on American citizens.

Obama's first response to the document leaks was on June 7, 2013, to state his support on programs dealing with national security.

In December, an independent commission appointed by Obama released its findings, stating that the collection of metadata from American citizens should end.

=== Death penalty ===
Obama has said that the death penalty is used too frequently and inconsistently. However, he favors it for cases in which "the community is justified in expressing the full measure of its outrage." Speaking as a state senator about the Illinois legislature's constant additions to the list of factors that render a defendant eligible for the death penalty, Obama said, "We certainly don't think that we should [...] have this laundry list that does not make any distinctions between the run-of-the-mill armed robbery that results in death and systematic killings by a terrorist organization. And I think essentially what the reduction of aggravating factors does is, it says, 'Here's a narrower set of crimes that we think potentially at least could deserve the death penalty.'" In his own words, "While the evidence tells me that the death penalty does little to deter crime; I believe there are some crimes – mass murder, the rape and murder of a child – so heinous that the community is justified in expressing the full measure of its outrage by meting out the ultimate punishment. On the other hand, the way capital cases were tried in Illinois at the time was so rife with error, questionable police tactics, racial bias, and shoddy lawyering, that 13 death row inmates had been exonerated."

On June 25, 2008, Obama condemned United States Supreme Court decision Kennedy v. Louisiana, which outlawed the death penalty for crimes against a person in which the victim did not die and the victim's death was not intended. The defendant in the specific case was convicted of child rape. He said that states have the right to consider capital punishment for these cases, but cited concern about the possibility of unfairness in some sentences.

When Obama was president, he called the death penalty "deeply troubling", but said that he still supports it "in theory".

=== Criteria for selecting judges ===
On October 15, 2008, during the third and final presidential debate, Obama said, "I will look for those judges who have an outstanding judicial record, who have the intellect, and who hopefully have a sense of what real-world folks are going through." According to MSNBC, on July 17, 2007, Obama said, "We need somebody who's got the heart, the empathy, to recognize what it's like to be a young teenage mom. The empathy to understand what it's like to be poor, or African-American, or gay, or disabled, or old. And that's the criteria by which I'm going to be selecting my judges." However, he stated at the final debate that "the most important thing in any judge is their capacity to provide fairness and justice to the American people."

As president, Obama was successful in appointing two judges to the Supreme Court of the United States, Sonia Sotomayor in 2009, and Elena Kagan in 2010.

== Internet regulation ==
On November 10, 2014, President Obama recommended the Federal Communications Commission reclassify broadband Internet service as a telecommunications service in order to preserve net neutrality.

== Parental responsibility ==
During a February 28, 2008, speech in Beaumont, Texas, Obama said, "It's not good enough for you to say to your child, 'Do good in school,' and then when that child comes home, you got the TV set on, you got the radio on, you don't check their homework, there is not a book in the house, you've got the video game playing... So turn off the TV set, put the video game away. Buy a little desk or put that child by the kitchen table. Watch them do their homework. If they don't know how to do it, give them help. If you don't know how to do it, call the teacher. Make them go to bed at a reasonable time. Keep them off the streets. Give 'em some breakfast... I also know that if folks letting our children drink eight sodas a day, which some parents do, or, you know, eat a bag of potato chips for lunch, or Popeyes for breakfast [...] You can't do that. Children have to have proper nutrition. That affects also how they study, how they learn in school." According to the White House website: "The President has also proposed an historic investment in providing home visits to low-income, first-time parents by trained professionals. The President and First Lady are also committed to ensuring that children have nutritious meals to eat at home and at school, so that they grow up healthy and strong."

== Education ==
As president, Obama signed the Every Student Succeeds Act in 2015.

== Voting rights ==
After Section 3 of the Voting Rights Act of 1965 was struck down by the Supreme Court in Shelby v. Holder in 2013, Obama called for Congress to pass new protections for minorities for the VRA.

=== District of Columbia voting rights ===
Residents of Washington, D.C., do not have voting representation in Congress, as residents of states do, under the United States Constitution. Instead, Washington currently elects a non-voting delegate to the United States House of Representatives and has no representation in the United States Senate.

Obama supports "full representation in Congress" for residents of the District of Columbia. As a Senator, Obama co-sponsored the failed Voting Rights Act of 2007, which would have granted the District of Columbia full voting representation in the House.

== Religion ==
Obama has encouraged Democrats to reach out to evangelicals and other church-going people, saying, "if we truly hope to speak to people where they're at – to communicate our hopes and values in a way that's relevant to their own – we cannot abandon the field of religious discourse." He supports separation of church and state and contends that: "I also think that we are under obligation in public life to translate our religious values into moral terms that all people can share, including those who are not believers. And that is how our democracy's functioning, will continue to function. That's what the founding fathers intended." In July 2008, Obama said that if elected president he would expand the delivery of social services through churches and other religious organizations, vowing to achieve what he said President Bush had fallen short on. His 2008 campaign web site contains his Faith Statement.

== Immigration ==
As president, Obama enacted an executive order known as DACA.

During Obama's term, the number of people deported remained high.

In terms of statistics, the Obama administration deported nearly 3 million people.

== Gun policy ==
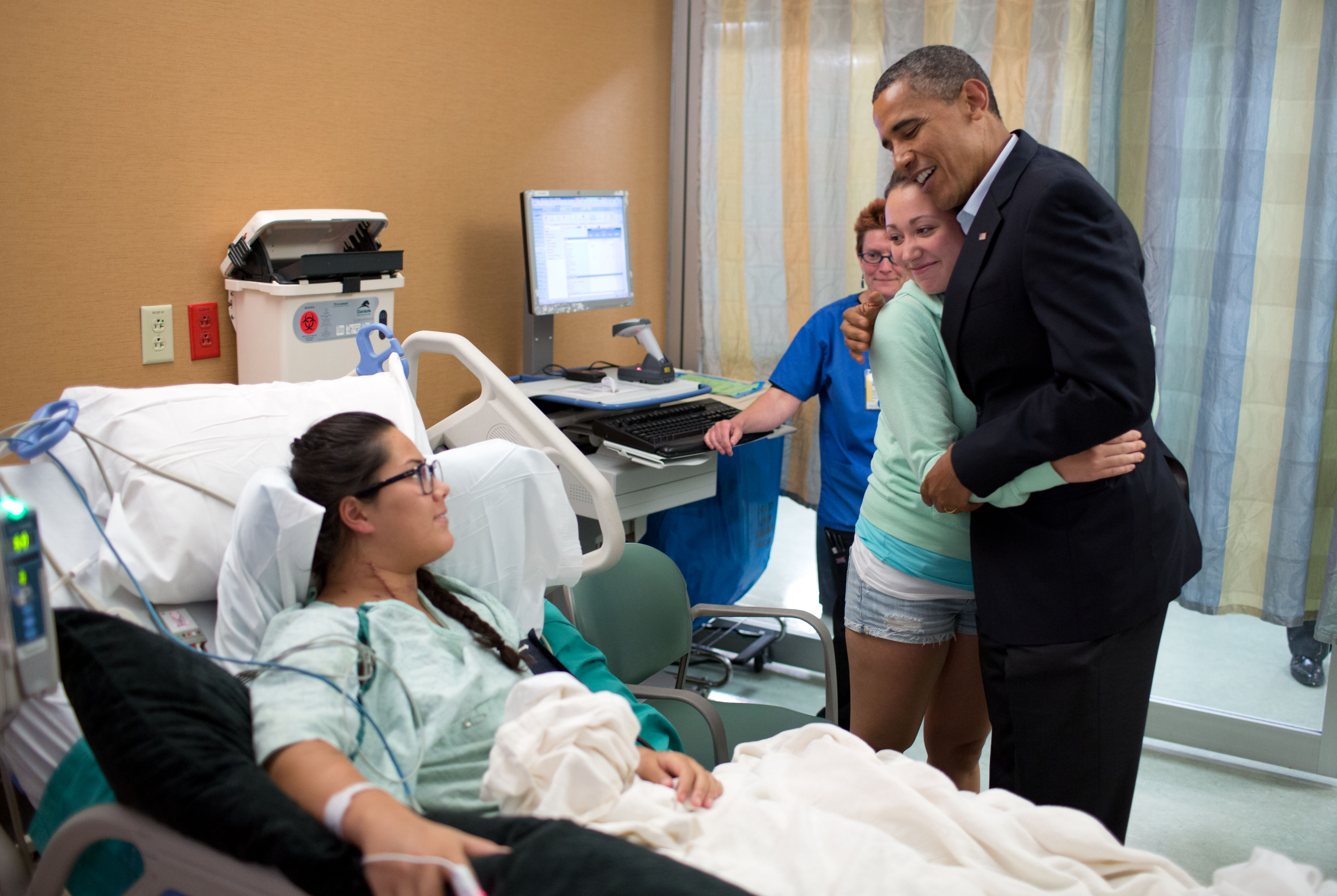
Obama visiting 2012 Aurora, Colorado shooting victims at University of Colorado Hospital

As a state legislator in Illinois, Obama supported banning the sale or transfer of all forms of semi-automatic firearms, increasing state restrictions on the purchase and possession of firearms and requiring manufacturers to provide child-safety locks with firearms.

In 1996, during Obama's run for the Illinois State Senate, he was surveyed by a Chicago nonprofit, the Independent Voters of Illinois (IVI) about criminal justice and other issues. Obama's questionnaire showed that he supported a ban on the manufacture, sale and possession of handguns. Subsequently, Obama denied that his writing was on the document and said that he never favored a ban on the sale and possession of handguns. In 1999, he urged prohibiting the operation of any gun store within five miles of a school or park, which according to gun-rights advocates would eliminate gun stores from most of the inhabited portion of the United States. He sponsored a bill in 2000 limiting handgun purchases to one per month.

As state senator, he voted against a 2004 measure that allowed self-defense as an affirmative defense for those charged with violating local laws making it otherwise unlawful for such persons to possess firearms. He also voted against allowing persons who had obtained domestic violence protective orders to carry handguns for their protection.

From 1994 through 2002, Obama was a board member of the Joyce Foundation, which amongst other non-gun related activities provides funds for gun control organizations in the United States.

While in the U.S. Senate, Obama has supported several gun control measures, including restricting the purchase of firearms at gun shows and the reauthorization of the Federal Assault Weapons Ban. Obama voted against legislation protecting firearm manufacturers from certain liability suits, which gun-rights advocates say are designed to bankrupt the firearms industry. Obama did vote in favor of the 2006 Vitter Amendment to prohibit the confiscation of lawful firearms during an emergency or major disaster, which passed 84–16.

During a February 15, 2008, press conference, Obama stated, "I think there is an individual right to bear arms, but it's subject to commonsense regulation." Obama has also stated his opposition to allowing citizens to carry concealed firearms and supports a national law outlawing the practice, saying on Chicago Public Radio in 2004, "I continue to support a ban on concealed carry laws".

Obama initially voiced support of Washington, D.C.'s handgun ban and said that it was constitutional. Following the Supreme Court decision that the ban was unconstitutional, he revised his position in support of the decision overturning the law, saying, "Today's decision reinforces that if we act responsibly, we can both protect the constitutional right to bear arms and keep our communities and our children safe." He also said, in response to the ruling, "I have always believed that the Second Amendment protects the right of individuals to bear arms... The Supreme Court has now endorsed that view."

After being elected as president, Obama announced that he favors measures that respect Second Amendment rights, while at the same time keeping guns away from children and criminals. He further stated that he supports banning private transfers of firearms at gun shows (referred to as "closing the gun show loophole"), "making guns in this country childproof", and permanently reinstating the expired Federal Assault Weapons Ban.

The Obama administration had changed the stance of the United States regarding the proposed United Nations treaty on trade in small arms from strong opposition to support for the treaty if it is passed by "consensus." According to recent deliberations regarding the treaty, signatory countries would be required to adopt "international standards for the import, export and transfer of conventional arms" in order "to prevent the diversion of conventional arms from the legal market into the illicit market." Despite popular claims to the contrary, the treaty would not restrict U.S. citizens' Second Amendment rights for various reasons. Most notably, a specific provision in the preamble acknowledges "the right of States to regulate internal transfers of arms and national ownership, including through national constitutional protections on private ownership, exclusively within their territory."

On January 16, 2013, one month after the Sandy Hook Elementary School shooting, President Obama outlined a series of sweeping gun control proposals, urging Congress to reintroduce an expired ban on "military-style" assault weapons, such as those used in several recent mass shootings, impose limits on ammunition magazines to 10 rounds, introduce background checks on all gun sales, pass a ban on possession and sale of armor-piercing bullets, introduce harsher penalties for gun-traffickers, especially unlicensed dealers who buy arms for criminals and approving the appointment of the head of the federal Bureau of Alcohol, Tobacco, Firearms and Explosives for the first time since 2006.

== See also ==
- Comparison of United States presidential candidates, 2008
- List of Barack Obama presidential campaign endorsements, 2008
- Political positions of Joe Biden
- President Obama's fiscal year 2015 budget proposal - Obama's budget proposal indicates what a lot of his spending priorities and objectives were, many of which had to do with social policy.
