= Saint Elias Monastery (Shwayya, Lebanon) =

Coordinates: 33.9222°N 35.7131°E

The Patriarchal Monastery of Saint Elias – Shwayya (or Deir Mar Elias Shwayya; Arabic: دير مار إلياس شويّا البطريركيّ) is a stauropegic monastery of the Greek Orthodox Church of Antioch, perched atop a sandstone cliff in the Matn District, thirty-one kilometers from Beirut.

Standing at an altitude of 1150 meters, it overlooks the resort towns of Bikfaya, Khinshara, and Shwayr, and a string of small mountainside villages such as Zighrine, Shwayya, Ayn Teffaha, Shrine, and Jouar. The entire region is covered with lush pine forests, and the area surrounding the monastery is unusually diverse in flora, with oak, eucalyptus, willow, and maple trees, orchards of apples, pears, prunes, and peaches, and vines terraced on the slopes.

The stones of the monastery are hewn from the cliff, and, from a distance, the monastery dissolves into its background, seeming to rise beyond the cliff as a natural continuation. Elias or Elijah, the Old Testament prophet, is a Christian saint also venerated by Muslims and especially the Druze. Together with St. George and St. Michael, he forms a trinity of military saints to whom several churches and monasteries in Lebanon are dedicated. As defender of the true faith, he did not hesitate to use force in slitting the throats of the priests of the Canaanite god Ba'al, worshipped by the king of Israel, Ahab, and his wife Jezebel. Even though he is an Old Testament figure, Elias is regarded as an example of the monastic life because of his long residence in the wilderness, during which he was fed by ravens. The Greek Orthodox monastery lies next to a Maronite monastery also dedicated to Elias, which belongs to the Mariamite (previously Aleppine) order.

The monastery is a summer residence of the patriarchate, and meetings of the Holy Antiochian Synod are regularly held there. St. Elias Shwayya also remains a popular place of pilgrimage. On the saint's feast day of July 20, people from all regions take part in liturgical celebrations held at the monastery.

== History ==
Archives, inscriptions, and architecture provide sketchy and sometimes contradictory information on the monastery's origin. The oldest document found at the monastery is a land-purchase deed dated 1004 in the Islamic calendar, corresponding to 1595–1596.

In his history of Bikfaya, Edmond Blaybel states that the Greek Orthodox monastery of St. Elias Shwayya was built in 1612 on a plot of land belonging to the priest Boutros al-Klink, who also granted the new monastery lands in the domains of Abou Mizane and Zighrine.

However, there is architectural evidence of an older foundation date in the monastic basement, which includes six cells joined by small doorways and two larger rooms that probably served as a twin-nave church. The rooms are hewn from the cliff and completed on the open side by a barrel-vaulted roof and thick wall, a form known from both the early Christian (fifth-sixth centuries) and the Crusader period (twelfth-thirteenth centuries). In either case, then, it seems that the monastery of St. Elias, like most Orthodox monasteries, was refounded during the Ottoman period after a long period of abandonment.

St. Elias Shwayya suffered from the schism of 1724. The monastery was granted to Greek Catholics and Greek Orthodox, depending on which community paid more revenues to the local Druze Abillama‘ emirs. In 1728, the Russian traveler Barsky reported the presence of five monks at St. Elias Shwayya. A document published by the historian Asad Rustom records that the Greek Orthodox finally recovered the monastery in 1749, when Yunis Nicolas al-Jbayli paid 1500 piastres to the emirs Isma‘il and Hassan Abillama‘. Yunis entrusted the monastery to Orthodox monks and the Abilama‘ emirs undertook to protect them and hear their grievances. It is a typical document revealing the precarious status of waqf lands during this period. The endowment of monasteries in this manner was frequent, being a convenient way of increasing agricultural production and tax revenues.

However, the modern history of St. Elias Shwayya may be said to begin in 1760, when it was rebuilt after a severe earthquake by a Beiruti notable, Yunis Nicolas al-Jbayli and the superior Sophronios al-Sayqali. A commemorative inscription over the church's north door records this event. Despite chronic political and clan rivalries in Mount Lebanon, St. Elias Shwayya prospered during the later eighteenth century and throughout the nineteenth century. It received the deposits of rich Greek Orthodox merchants from Beirut and the Biqa‘, and it loaned funds to peasant freeholders and sharecroppers of the region. Several agricultural domains were acquired and the monastery gained more waqf land in neighboring Abou-Mizane and Qinnabeh near Broumana. St. Elias Shwayya also became an important centre of silk production.

Throughout this period, the monastery's prosperity depended largely on good relations between monastic superiors and local notables. For example, Makarios, superior from 1833 to 1872, was an ally and friend of Emir Haydar Abilama‘, whose wife and children he sheltered when Haydar was exiled by the Egyptian government in 1840. When the Ottoman regime was restored in 1845, Mount Lebanon was divided into Druze and Christian districts and Haydar became governor of the Christian district. About this time, the monastery contained eight monks and eight servants, and its prosperity is indicated by the building of more cells in 1841. The English traveler David Urquhart visited St Elias Shwayya in 1850 and reported that the monastery had profited from a good silk harvest and a new building was to be constructed beside the church.

In the second half of the nineteenth century, the monastery established a school, which employed teachers of renown. Primary schools were later maintained at Qinnabeh and Abou-Mizane for the children of its local sharecroppers.

A strong Russian influence developed at St. Elias Shwayya from the later nineteenth century. Russian consuls donated grants to the school, and, both before and after the establishment of the Russian Imperial Palestine Society, Russian orientalists and diplomats such as Barsky, Basily, Krymsky, and Krachkovsky stayed for varying periods at St. Elias Shwayya. Russian monks came to stay when the Patriarch Gregory IV (Haddad) returned from Russia in 1910. They resided for nearly five years and made several additions and alterations to the monastery. Their simplicity and piety gained them the sympathy of the local inhabitants, but they were forced to leave when Turkey declared war against Russia in 1915.

Patriarch Gregory IV undertook the building of a road connecting the monastery to the village of Shwayr and the highway. He paid great attention to the monastery's agricultural production and its peasant sharecroppers. In 1906, for example, he advised the superior Gerasimos al-Dimashqi to build new houses for the sharecroppers of Abou-Mizane, and he planted twelve thousand mulberry trees on the monastic lands.

During the first half of the twentieth century, the monastic school continued to function. Some bishops completed their primary studies there before moving on to Balamand. During the Lebanese civil war, the monastery was seriously damaged by artillery fire, but the superior undertook meticulous repairs, which were completed in 1996.

== Architecture ==
The entire monastery is built of yellow orchre stone from the cliff-side and its architecture reveals four different styles.

=== Medieval basement ===
The basement contains two barrel-vaulted rooms separated by arcades and illuminated by a tiny window. They resemble twin-nave churches found in North Lebanon, and they probably formed the old monastic church. Adjacent to them are six barrel-vaulted cells abutting against the rock of the cliff. Their narrow embrasure-like entrances are cut into a wall up to ninety centimeters in thickness. These cells are arranged in diminishing size from east to west. The communicating doorways also become progressively smaller, so that the visitor must eventually bend down to pass through. Such features suggest a gradual initiation into a monastic life centred upon contemplation and prayer. These cells are comparable to the oldest cells in the monastery of Saydnaya in Syria. The first cell holds the coffin of Makarios Sadaqa, bishop of Beirut at the end of the nineteenth century, whose body is still well preserved.

No inscription exists to date the basement complex, but it probably goes back to the thirteenth century at least. The rooms were long used as storage cellars and stables, but they are all now empty. An iron-grilled door separates them from a staircase leading up to the ground floor.

=== Ground-floor constructions ===
These include the church, cells, and reception room built around two small interior courtyards, the whole ensemble being built by Yunis Nicolas al-Jbayli in 1760. It is reached through a main entrance corridor leading from an outer terrace with a fine mountain view.

The first courtyard is triangular. It is bounded by the south wall of the church and by a series of eleven barrel-vaulted cells fronted by a simple arcade. Only slightly larger than the basement cells, these cells have large windows and a massive outer wall. The local inhabitants gather in this courtyard on Sundays and feast days to ring the bell above the Arabic-style church door. This was probably the door of the original church, destroyed by earthquake in 1759. A plaque commemorates the reconstruction, its Arabic letters carrying a symbolic numerical value that gives the date April 4, 1760. The door and inscription are surmounted by a lintel engraved with religious motifs.

The second courtyard is joined to the first by three steps. Narrower than the first, it is surrounded by the west façade of the church, the reception room, and a corridor connecting the church with the building constructed by the Russian monks at the start of the twentieth century.

The church door in the middle of the west façade is fronted by a porch similar in its decoration to those in the houses of Dayr al-Qamar and Bayt ad-Din. The decorative elements found here were probably introduced from Italy after Mount Lebanon was opened to Western trade. Otherwise, however, the church is remarkable for its simplicity. Two windows in the north wall allow but feeble light to enter. Despite the church's small size, the ribbed vault of the ceiling gives a feeling of spaciousness. The arcs of the vault join to form an eight-branched star adorned in the centre by a beautiful flower.

The walnut iconostasis was finely carved by Greek artisans at the beginning of the twentieth century. The royal gate is flanked by the figures of the twelve disciples and surmounted by a relief representing an elephant, pigeons, two-headed angels symbolizing the two natures of Christ or three heads symbolizing the Holy Trinity, and the lamb symbolizing the sacrifice of Christ. Reliefs in the center of the lower register illustrate the Annunciation, the beheading of St. John the Baptist, the Nativity, and St. Elias executing the priests of Ba'al. All these reliefs correspond in subject to the icons above them. Vegetal motifs interweave throughout the iconostasis.

To the right, the throne of the bishop or superior is topped by a cupola decorated with flowers, arabesques, and an angel holding a serpent, symbolizing victory over evil. To the left is an elevated pulpit for the deacon's readings. Raised two meters above the floor, it is decorated by a pigeon depositing the Bible and two angels holding candlesticks, all surrounded by a motif of arabesques and fruits. Both pieces seem to have been executed by the same sculptor.

=== Nineteenth-century buildings ===
Some of these were built by Patriarch Methodios (1841-1842); later in the century, a school was constructed at the level of the old basement. Architecturally, the school is comparable to those of Bkeftin and Balamand, although it is smaller than either. The masonry is precisely worked and the finishing of a high standard. There are two large halls, one barrel-vaulted and the other ribbed-vaulted, and several small classrooms along a corridor. Surprisingly, it lacks a central courtyard, perhaps because the winter weather was too cold for outdoor recreation. For this, however, pupils could use the two courtyards on the upper floor, accessible through the vaulted staircase leading up from the basement, or they could simply go into the neighbouring forest and orchards. The interior staircase functioned like those in traditional Lebanese mountain homes: the inhabitants on the upper floor used it to bring food and fuel from the cellar without having to go outside. The two halls probably boarded the pupils, a feature of most traditional Lebanese schools because of poor communications. Each hall is well lighted, with two great windows opening onto the valley.

=== The Russian monks’ building ===
In 1910, the monastery was granted to Russian monks. Although they only stayed a short time, they constructed a four-floor building to the right of the monastery entrance. Each upper floor contains three rooms, and the ground floor is partitioned into stables and cellars, now used to store firewood. The roof is made of parallel wooden beams and cross planks. Since the region is very cold in winter, the Russian monks built inlaid wall-chimneys drawing from small wood-burning stoves in each room. They also established a mechanically controlled irrigation system: the flow of water to the gardens and orchards was regulated by a network of cords operated by lines from the monastery.

== Manuscripts and icons ==
At the height of its prosperity, the monastery was the center of the region's religious and cultural life. It possesses sixty-three manuscripts, including fifty-four liturgical manuals prescribing celebrations and prayers throughout the year. The other nine manuscripts contain such standard theological works as the sermons of St. John Chrysostom, St. John Damascene's On the Orthodox Faith, and John Climacus’ Ladder of Virtues. Perhaps the most important manuscript is the typicon of St. Saba, an ancient rule of monastic and liturgical life, copied at the monastery of St. John the Baptist Douma in 1595. The only secular manuscript in the collection records the voyage to Palestine of a Beiruti notable, Faris Abu Halqa.

The icons preserved at St. Elias Shwayya are few but diverse. The oldest, representing St. Elias, is dated to the tenth or eleventh century. Housed in a glass frame to the left of the church, it has suffered deterioration and its style and manner of execution are difficult to discern. However, the prophet can be seen in a cave; as related in the biblical Book of Kings, a raven sent by God is bringing him food. He is represented in a contemplative attitude, his right hand against his cheek and his head slightly lifted. He wears an enveloping tunic with wide folds and austere colors.

Three icons placed upon the iconostasis were executed by the Bishop of Tripoli, Barthenios, in 1761, just after the church's restoration. They are typical of the Aleppine iconographic school, with Arabic inscriptions, brown faces, almond eyes, and sumptuous gilded costumes that reveal something of the prosperity and tastes of urban Syrian Christians at that time. The background is a dark gold tending towards orange. The luminous color of these icons blends with the dark tint of the wooden iconostasis to give a warm effect.

The first icon represents Christ as a bishop, blessing with his right hand and holding the open Bible in his left. He wears a tiara, above which is a halo decorated with spiral arabesques, and his gilded tunic displays floral and checkerboard motifs. The icon is covered with shimmering gilded lines outlining the hair and clothing, so that it almost resembles a work of gold jewelry.

The second icon represents the Mother of God as Queen of Heaven with a golden crown. Her right hand points to the infant Christ, also crowned, whom she cradles upright. A red rose clasped in her left hand, she wears a golden tunic and a maroon mantle studded with golden stars. The red and gold colors are warm and intimate; the faces, though rigid, are filled with a serene, solemn beauty.

The third icon represents the patron of the church, the prophet Elias, slaying the priests of Ba'al. He brandishes a long scimitar above his head, and his left hand is stretched towards the heads piled on the ground. The strongly drawn folds of the maroon tunic display the movement of the body.

Three other icons on the iconostasis are very different in style. They are most likely of Russian origin, brought by the Russian monks in 1910. They represent St. George slaying the dragon, St. John the Baptist, and St. Spiridon. The chiaroscuro shading of the icons gives a cold light, in contrast to the dark iconostasis. The figures are pale and the faces have a wan expression.

Another icon lacks signature and date but was probably painted at the beginning of the nineteenth century. An inscription records that it was donated in waqf by a certain Farah for the repose of his father's soul. The icon displays an original composition with four different scenes from the life of the prophet Elias. The river Jordan is shown in the center with brown hills to either side. To the left, St. Elias kneels, his hands uplifted to heaven; before him, a calf is consumed as a burnt-offering to God. Below right, he is seated under a tree as an angel brings him food. Above right, the kneeling Elie sees Christ appearing in a blue sphere borne by two angels amid rosy clouds. In his right hand, Christ holds a phylactery inscribed: ‘The people of Israel have renounced God and demolished his temples.’ Above the hill, St. Elias is borne upwards in a chariot of fire drawn by four horses. He hands his folded cloak to his disciple Elisha, who stands on the summit. Elisha is about to strike the waters of the Jordan with his master's cloak so that he can walk across it dry-shod. The ascent of Elias into heaven on a chariot of fire has usually inspired very decorative compositions. Here, in contrast, the composition is simple yet powerful, tending almost to abstraction. The colors are green, red, black, and brown, with a golden background.
