= Danielle Carnival =

American neuroscientist

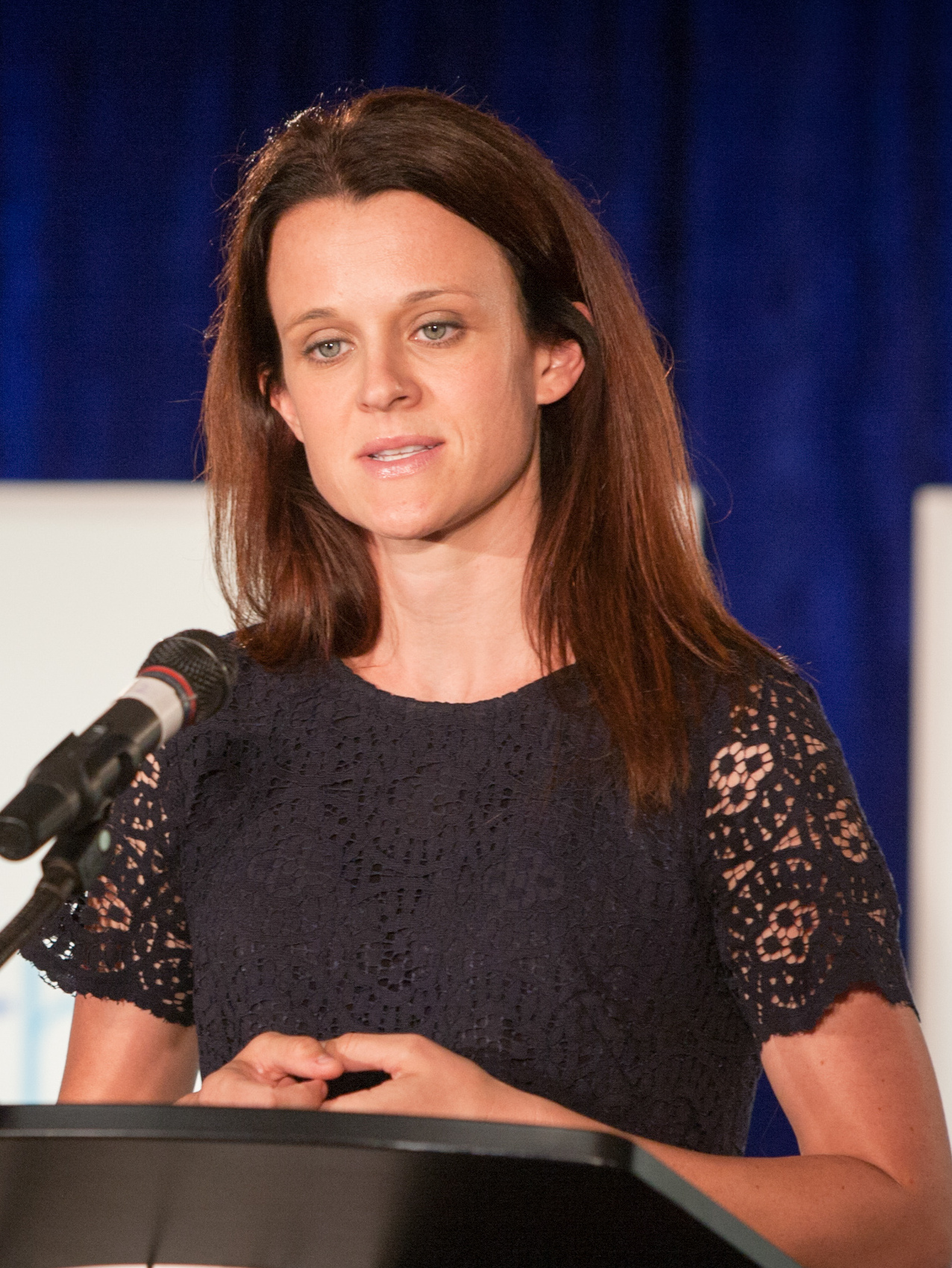
- Carnival in 2017
- Born: Danielle M. Evers
- Education: Boston College; Georgetown University
- Scientific career
- Fields: Neuroscience
- Doctoral advisor: Daniel Pak

Danielle Carnival (née Evers) is an American neuroscientist served as deputy assistant to the president for the Beau Biden Cancer Moonshot initiative and the deputy director for health outcomes in the White House Office of Science and Technology Policy.

== Life ==
Carnival is from Troy, New York. She earned a B.S. in biochemistry from Boston College in 2005. She completed a Ph.D. in neuroscience at Georgetown University. Her dissertation was titled, Homeostatic control of AMPA receptor strength and subunit composition by Polo-like kinase 2. Daniel Pak was her doctoral advisor.

In 2010, Carnival began working at the White House for five years on the areas of science education, diversity in science, and technology. In 2016, she became the chief of staff to Greg Simon and senior policy director of the Beau Biden Cancer Moonshot initiative. From 2017 to 2019, she worked as the vice president of the Biden Cancer Initiative at the Biden Foundation. In September 2019, she became the chief executive officer of the I Am ALS nonprofit. In 2021, U.S. president Joe Biden was named Carnival as a senior advisor in the Office of Science and Technology Policy (OSTP) tasked with patient engagement and supporting a new iteration of the Moonshot program. She is the deputy assistant to the president for Cancer Moonshot and the OSTP deputy director for health outcomes.
