= Khenchara =

Khenchara خنشارة
- City
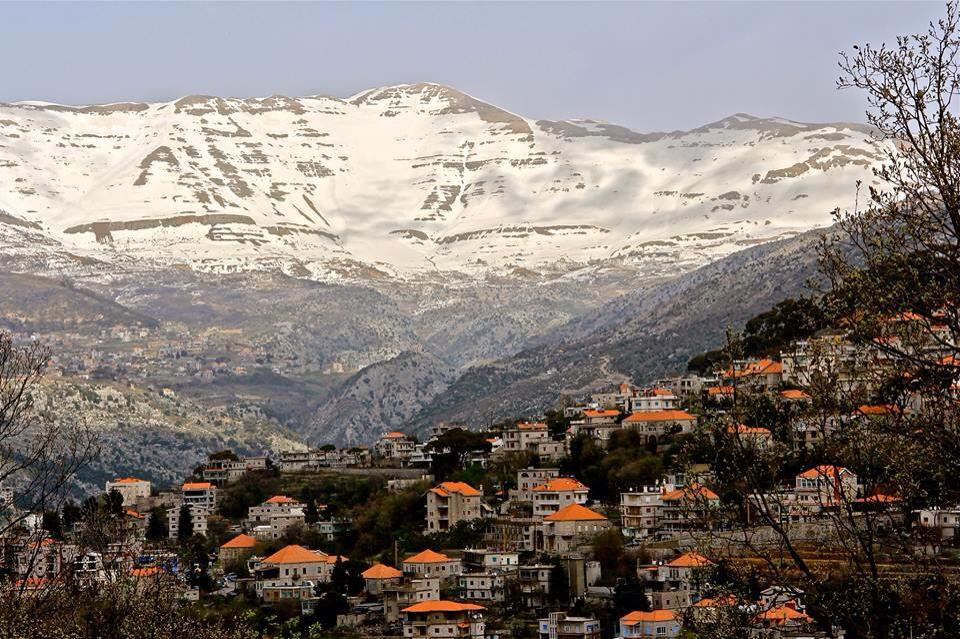
- Khenchara, 2014

- Location in Lebanon
- Coordinates: 33.9240°N 35.7376°E
- Country: Lebanon
- Governorate: Mount Lebanon Governorate
- District: Matn District
- Time zone: UTC+2 (EET)
  - Summer (DST): UTC+3 (EEST)
- Dialing code: 04

Khenchara (Arabic: الخنشارة, romanized: al-Khinshāra) is a village in Lebanon. It is situated in the Metn district (or qadaa) (Caza). It is located between Ghabet Bologna (غابة بولونيا), Bteghrine (بتغرين) and Dhour El Choueir - Ain el Sendianeh (ضهور الشوير - عين السنديانة).

The village is 30 kilometres (18.6 mi) north east of Beirut. The altitude of the village ranges from 1070 m to 1200 m. Covering an area of about 328 hectares (1.26 sq mi), this attractive village is known for its traditional red-roofed brick houses and its skilled stonemasons.

Khenchara and Jouar are under the same municipality. The estimated population number is 3543. The most common families installed in the village are : Samaha, Riachy, Kanaan, Kassouf, Kfoury, Korban, Kouzy, Moawad, Henoud, Akl, Maalouf, Bejjeni, Barakat, Aboud and Abou Chawareb. The majority of the population is Melkites with some Maronites and Greek Orthodox Christians.

Khenchara is the home of the Melchite Catholics, the Monastery of St. John of Chouweir or Deir et-Tabcheh, the motherhouse of the Basilian Chouerite Order, founded 1696–97. The oldest of its three churches is dedicated to St. John the Baptist and dates to the 12th century. There is also the 18th century church of Saint Nicolas, with its beautiful iconostatis of wood.

In addition to its notable collection of icons and library, the monastery is also known as the site of the Middle East's first Arabic Printing Press Arabic language printing press, whose first original publication appeared in 1734. A five-room museum displays the old presses and some 450 related objects and pieces of equipment.

The founder of the press, Greek Catholic monk, Abdallah Zakher from Aleppo, built the printing machine between 1726 and 1733, the first homemade press in Lebanon, and set it up in 1733 at the monastery of Saint John. He created the first true Arabic script type in the Middle East, personally cut the type molds for using movable type, and did the founding of the elegant typeface. The first book off the Zakhir press was printed in 1734; this press continued to be used until 1899.

The weather in Khenchara is pretty pleasant with temperatures varying from 18 to 35 degrees Celsius in summer, 13 to 20 degrees Celsius in autumn. In winter, the weather is cold with the temperatures varying from -7 to 10 degrees Celsius. It snows every winter between 30 and 70 centimeters, but the snow quickly melts.
