= Monique Dorsainvil =

American politician (born 1987)

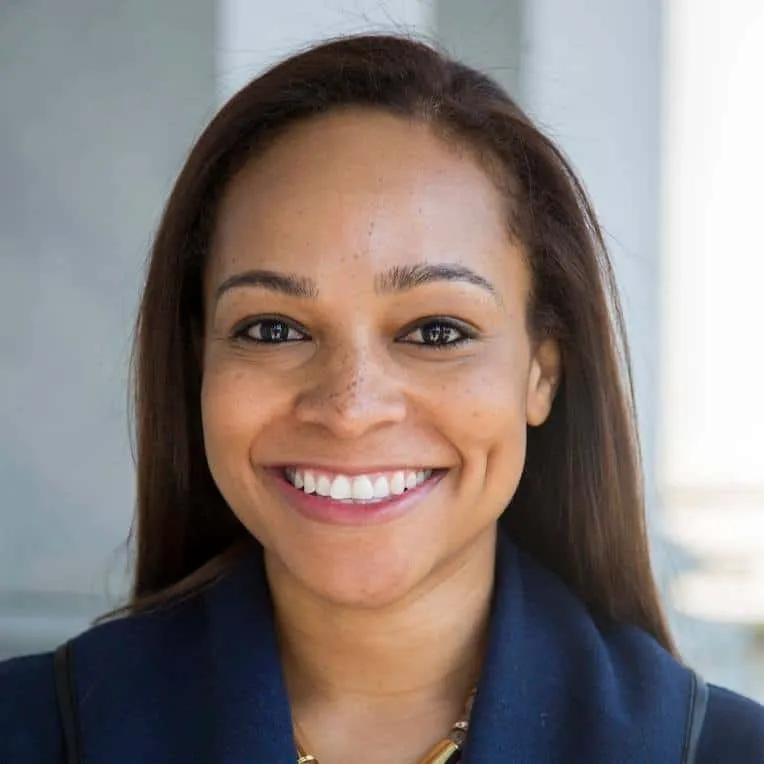
- Born: 1987 (age 38–39); Woodland Hills, California
- Education: Emory University
- Occupations: Strategic Planner, LGBTQ Liaison
- Years active: 2009-present
- Employer: White House
- Awards: Lucius Lamar McMullan Award (Emory University)

Monique Dorsainvil (born 1987) was the Deputy Chief of Staff and Senior Advisor for the White House Office of Public Engagement and Intergovernmental Affairs. She previously served as LGBTQ Liaison to the White House.

== Education ==
Dorsainvil was born in 1987 and grew up in Woodland Hills, California. She attended high school at the United World College of the American West in New Mexico. She graduated from Emory University earning a bachelor's degree in Global Health and Gender Studies and was the recipient of the Lucius Lamar McMullan Award from Emory.

== Career ==
Shortly after her 2009 graduation, Dorsainvil began working as an intern at the White House in the office of First Lady Michelle Obama. By 2012, she had moved up to the deputy director of Advance and Special Events and by 2013, was the Director of Planning and Events for Public Engagement and Intergovernmental Affairs.

Dorsainvil, who is openly gay, stepped into the position of White House's LGBT liaison in 2014, when Gautam Raghavan resigned the post. She had previously served on the White House Council on Women and Girls and Lesbian, Gay, Bisexual, and Transgender Outreach. In November 2014, Dorsainvil was replaced when the White House hired Aditi Hardikar as the permanent LGBT Liaison. While serving as liaison, Dorsainvil continued with her duties as Director of Planning and Events for Public Engagement and Intergovernmental Affairs, which include strategic planning and event logistics.
