= Biden Foundation =

United States non-profit organization from 2017 to 2019

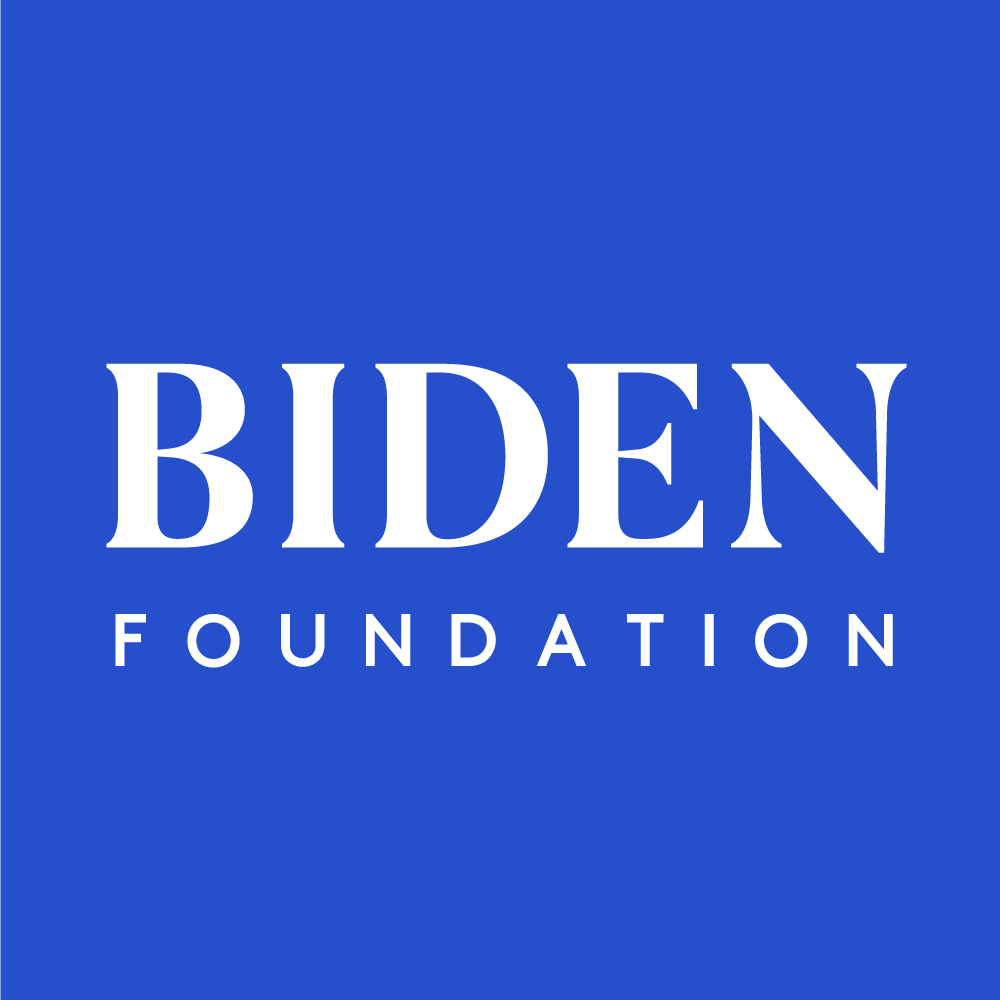
- Formation: February 1, 2017; 9 years ago (Note: Established and received approval in 2016)
- Founders: Joe Biden; Jill Biden
- Dissolved: April 25, 2019; 7 years ago
- Type: Nonprofit
- Tax ID no.: 81-1329470
- Legal status: Foundation

The Biden Foundation was a nonprofit organization under section 501(c)(3) of the United States tax code that existed from 2017 to 2019. It was established by then-former United States vice president Joe Biden and Jill Biden with the stated mission to "champion progress and prosperity for American families".

== Origins ==
The initial establishment of the Biden Foundation as a 501(c)(3) organization was done, and received the approval of U.S. tax authorities, in 2016.

The Bidens publicly launched the Biden Foundation on February 1, 2017. It was stated that the purpose of the foundation was to allow them to continue pursuing the causes they cared most about once they left Washington. These causes included Joe Biden's Cancer Moonshot Initiative, from his time as vice president, and the Violence Against Women Act, from his time as senator; and Jill Biden's support for military families, which had begun as the Joining Forces initiative during her time as second lady, and her focus on community colleges, at one of which she continued to teach.

== Staff ==
Several former aides to Biden became prominent members of the foundation staff. The board's chair was Ted Kaufman, a senatorial chief of staff who had been appointed to fill Biden's senate seat when he became vice president. The board's vice-chair was Valerie Biden Owens, Joe Biden's sister and longtime political strategist. Executive director of the foundation was Louisa Terrell, another veteran of the Obama administration and various congressional staffs.

Also working for the foundation were former Obama administration political adviser Gautam Raghavan and former vice presidential economic advisor Ben Harris. Another figure associated with the foundation was former Senate Judiciary Committee counsel and U.S. ambassador Mark Gitenstein.

== Activities ==
The intent was that the foundation would be funded by donations, which would be tax-free to the donors. For 2017, the foundation reported raising $6.6 million. Among the donors to the foundation were retired corporate executive Bernard L. Schwartz and baseball owner Peter Angelos. The foundation did not accept money from foreign entities.

The New York Times reported that most of the funds raised by the foundation went to staff salaries rather than grants and that in 2017, it made only one grant, for around $500,000.

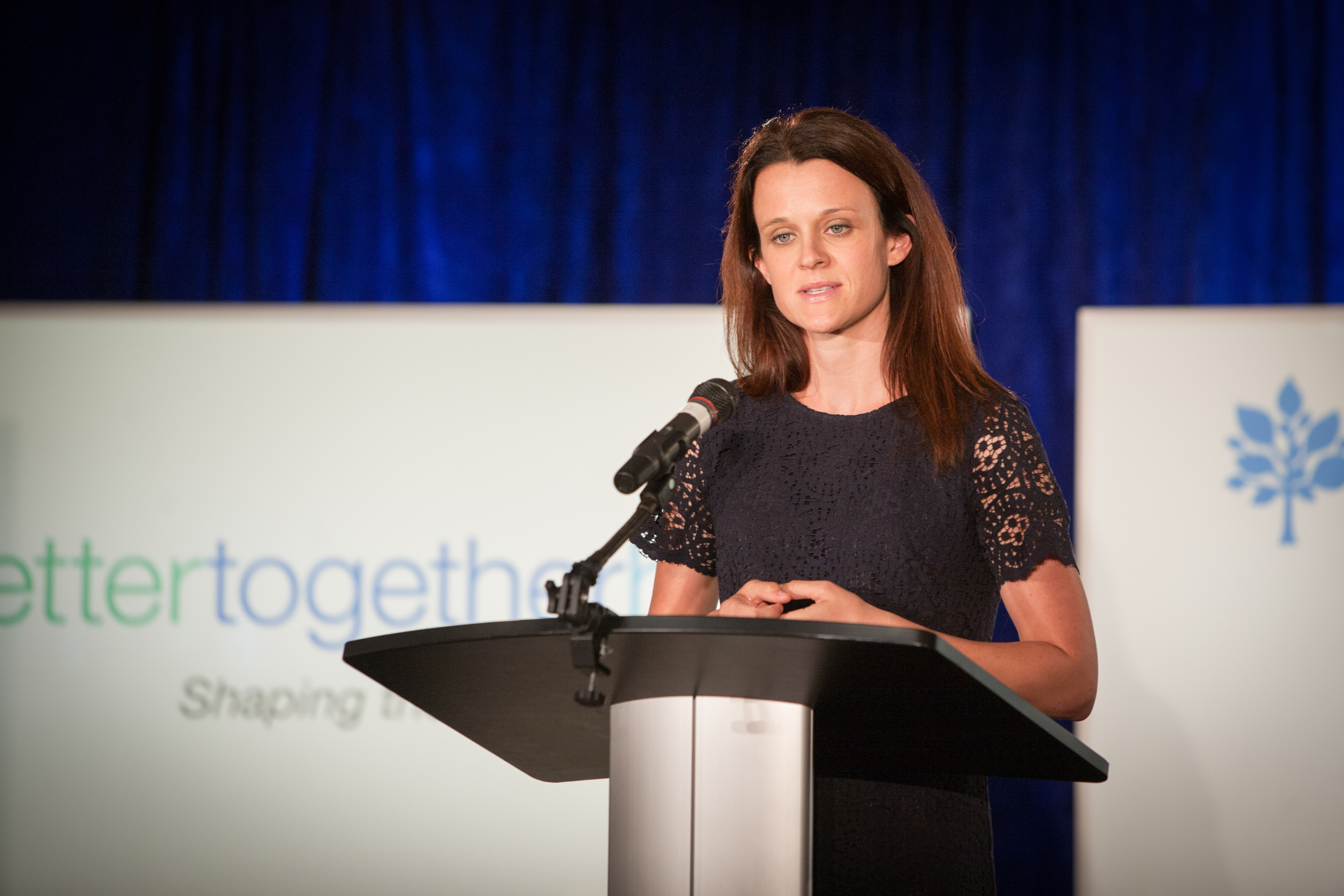
Danielle Carnival, Deputy Director of the Biden Foundation's Cancer Initiative, speaks at a healthcare-related event in May 2017

In May 2018 the David Bohnett Foundation, along with the Gill Foundation, partnered with the Biden Foundation and the YMCA in a collaborative project to improve the levels of inclusiveness shown at YMCA locations around the country towards LGBTQ people.

As part of the foundation, Jill Biden continued the advocacy work for military families that she had begun in Joining Forces. (Joining Forces was resumed once she became first lady in 2021.)

== Shutdown ==
On April 25, 2019, the foundation announced that it was suspending all operations, effective immediately, with a full wind-down of the foundation's activities to follow.

This closing was due to the advent of the 2020 Joe Biden presidential campaign, which was announced the same day. Biden and his staff were anxious to not re-live the experience of the Clinton Foundation during the 2016 United States presidential election, which had kept going and thereby faced a series of conflict-of-interest charges that had bedeviled the 2016 Hillary Clinton presidential campaign.
