= Zaarour =

Ski resort on Mount Sannine, Lebanon

- Location in Lebanon
- Location: Mount Lebanon
- Nearest city: Beirut
- Coordinates: 33.920698°N 35.812173°E
- Vertical: 1,000 m (3,280 ft)
- Top elevation: 2,000 m (6,560 ft)
- Base elevation: 1,645 m (5,400 ft)
- Total length: 16 km (9.9 mi)
- Lift capacity: 7
- Website: www.zaarourclub.com

Zaarour (Arabic: زعرور; Syriac: ܥܙܪܪܬܐ ) is a ski resort on the eastern slopes of Mount Sannine in the Matn District of Mount Lebanon Governorate, 35 km from Beirut. The name is the Arabic word for hawthorn, which in itself is a corruption of a Syriac word.

The highest elevation difference at the resort is 355 m. The resort introduced Handiski (a portmanteau of "handicap" and "ski") which provides specialist adaptive skiing to assist people with a disability or restricted mobility the opportunity to enjoy the pleasures of skiing.

== Gallery ==
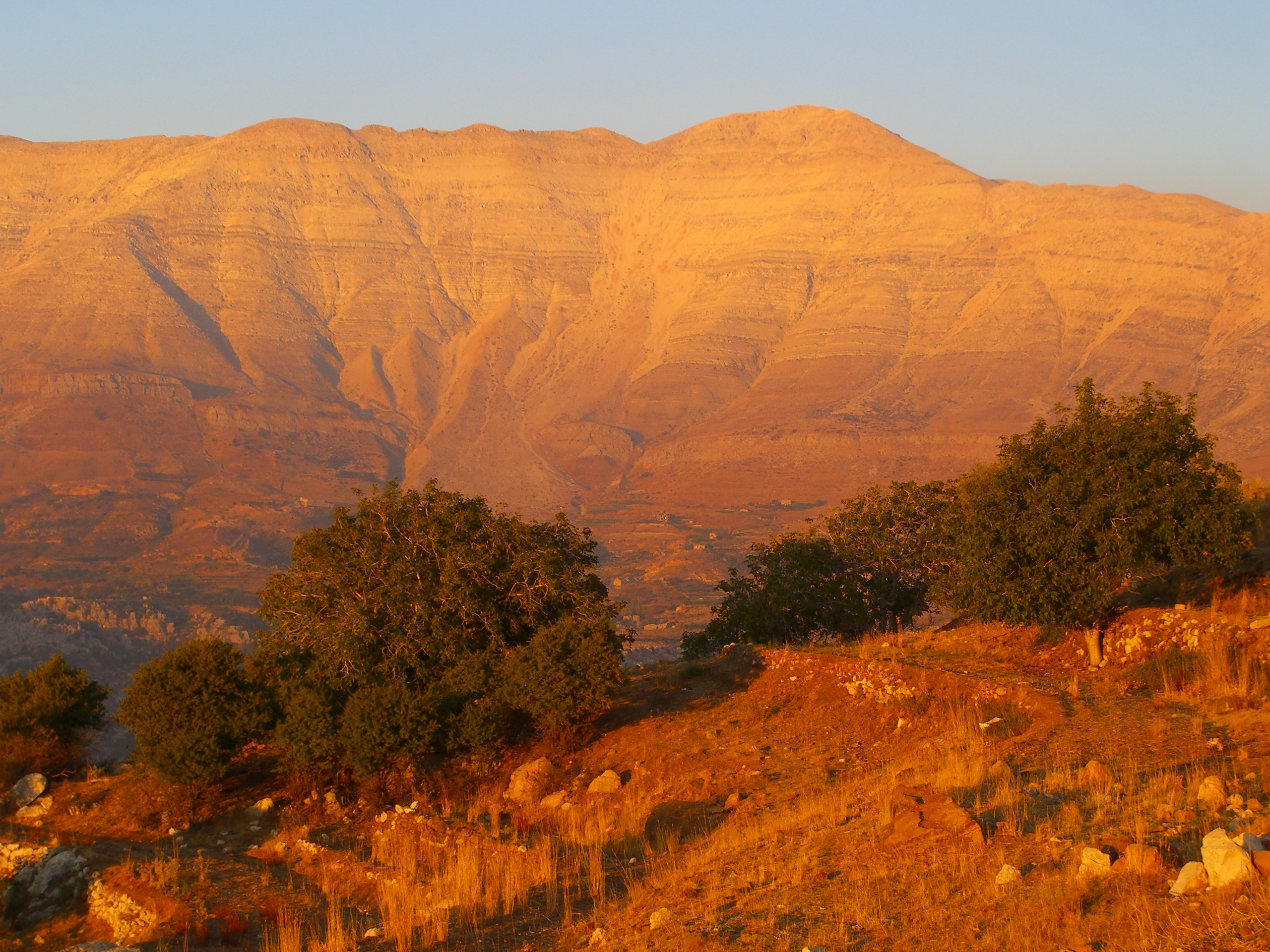

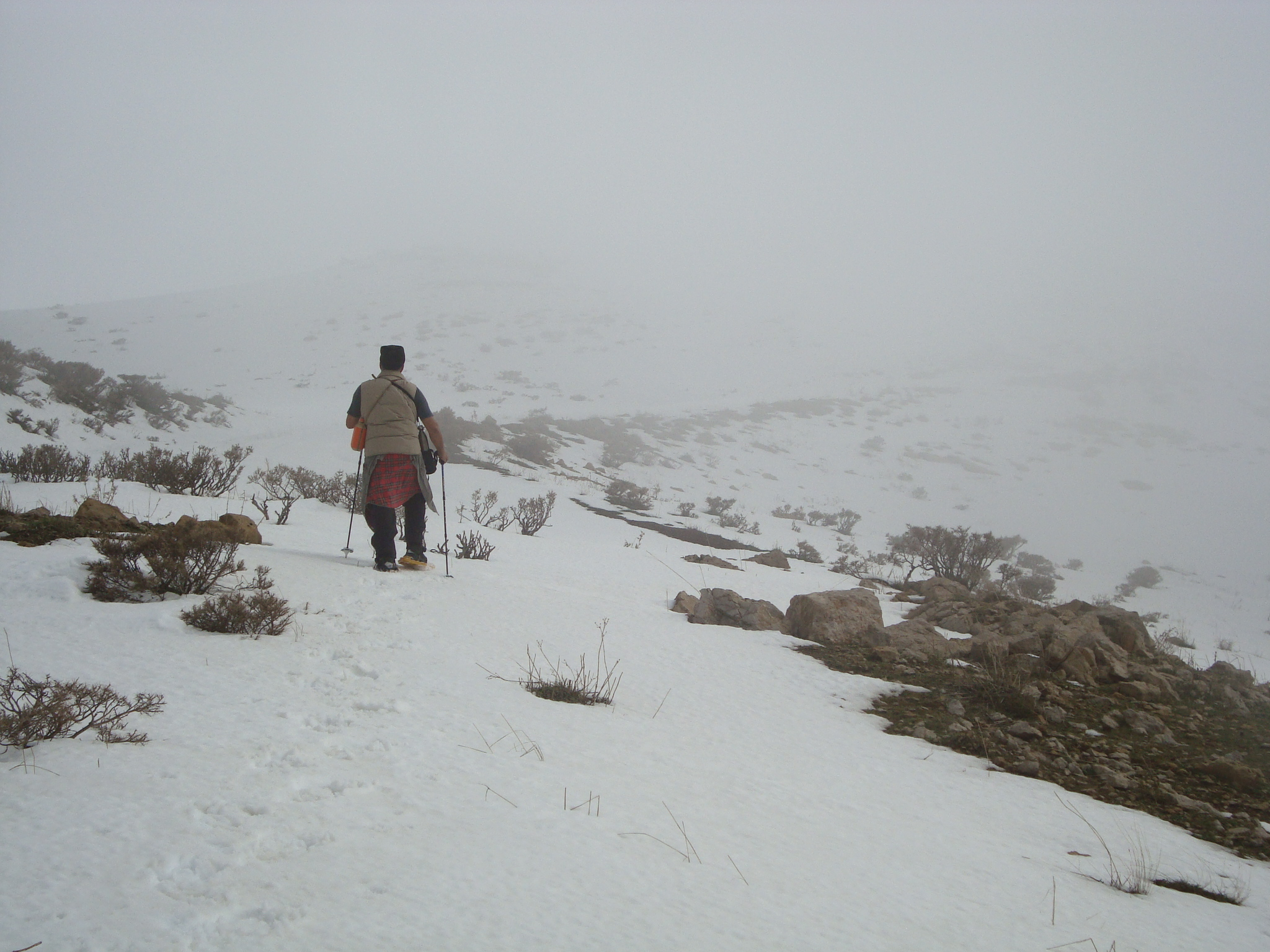

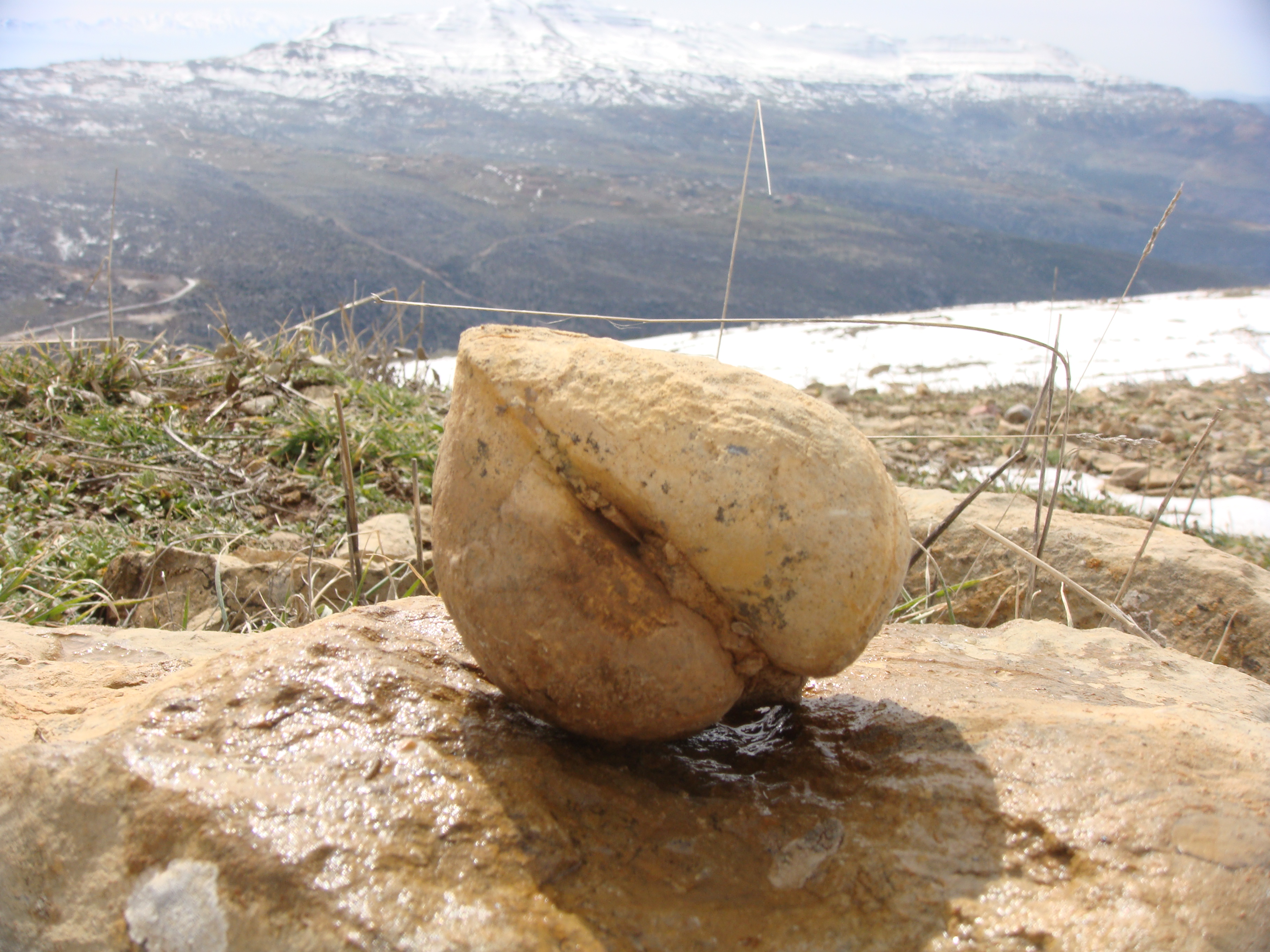

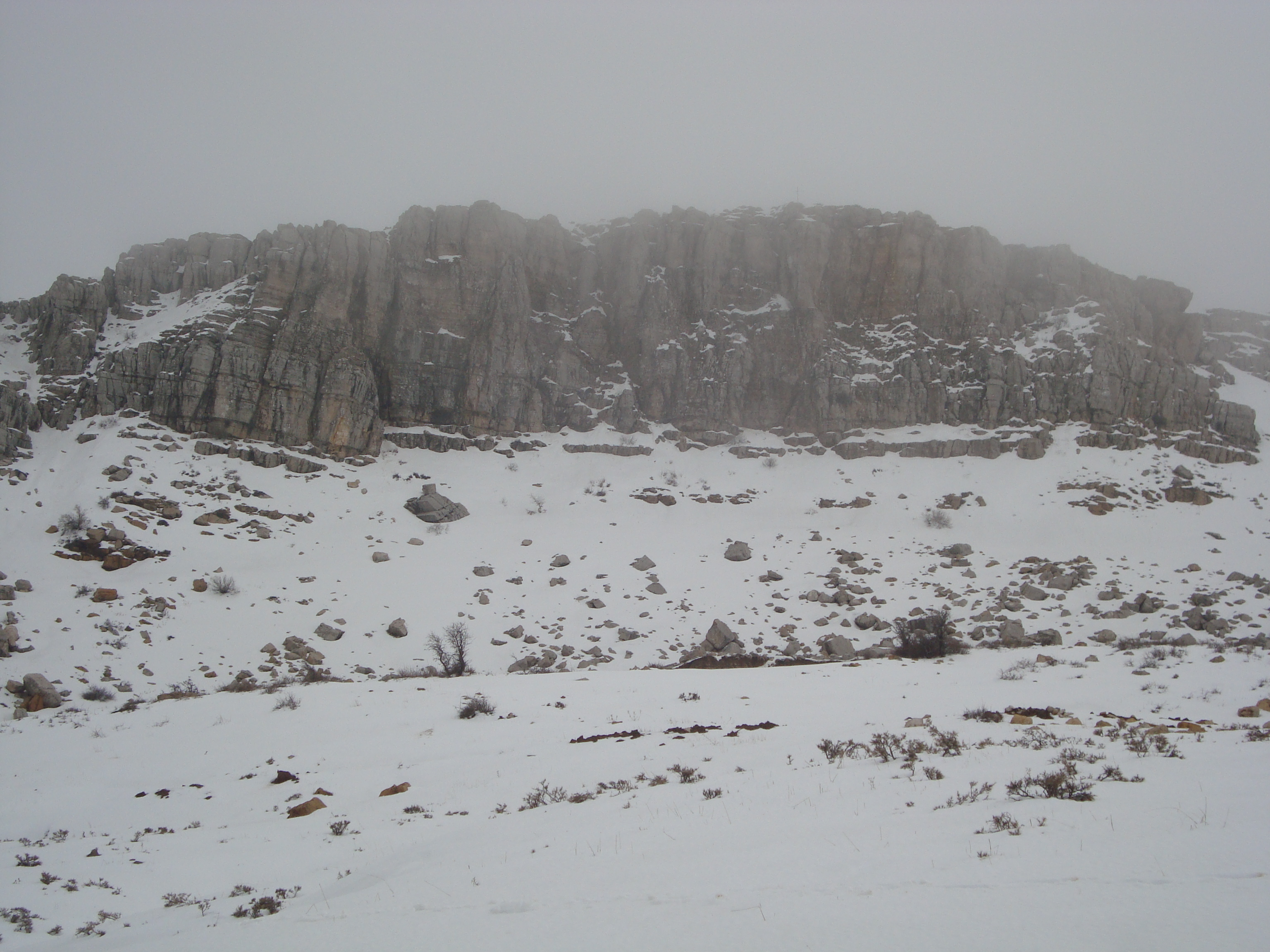
