= Greg Simon =

American political aide

Greg Simon is an American political aide who supported Vice Presidents Joe Biden and Al Gore. His private sector work is concentrated in the pharmaceutical, biotechnology, and telecommunications sectors. Simon is credited with advancing key federal health care and telecommunications policies.

== Early life and education ==
Simon grew up in Blytheville, Arkansas and received a B.A. in history from the University of Arkansas at Fayetteville. He graduated with his J.D. degree from the University of Washington School of Law in 1983 where he was a member of the Law Review and the Moot Court. Simon was a rock and roll drummer until he was thirty.

== Career ==
Simon was an aide to Vice President Al Gore, eventually working as his Chief Domestic Policy Advisor (‘93-’97) where he shepherded the 1996 Telecommunications Reform Act, crafted regulations for the biotech industry, and represented VP Gore on the National Economic Council.

Simon left the White House to found lobbying firm Simon Strategies. With his firm Simon lobbied for energy companies Enron and Southern Company, and telecom companies such as Sony, Netscape, Motorola, Global Crossing, AOL, and Cisco. Simon also lobbied for domain registrar Network Solutions. While maintaining his lobbying practice, Simon was a bundler and top advisor for Gore's 2000 presidential campaign. In June 2007, he was named to the Google Health Advisory Council.

Simon served on the Health and Human Services review team for the Obama-Biden transition in 2008. He then joined Pfizer as a Senior Vice President in charge of worldwide policy and patient engagement (2009–12). He also served as executive director of the White House Cancer Moonshot Task Force (2016) and President of the Biden Cancer Initiative at the Biden Foundation (2017–2019).

Simon spoke at the 2022 Forbes China Healthcare Summit hosted by Forbes China, Memorial Sloan Kettering Cancer Center and the Asia Society.

Simon was a co-founder of FasterCures and the Melanoma Research Alliance, and has served as an advisor for a number of biotechnology companies including Day One Therapeutics, Vaxart and WinSanTor. He also served as CEO of Poliwogg.
