= Aditi Hardikar =

American public official

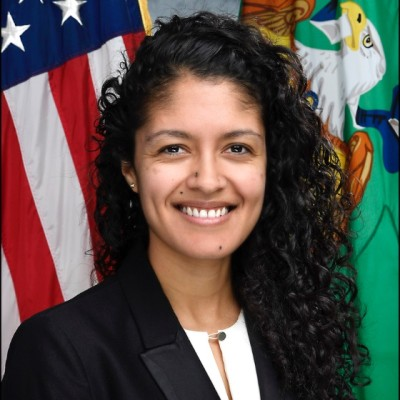

Acting Assistant Secretary of the Treasury for Management
- In office 2024–2025
- Preceded by: Anna Canfield Roth
- Succeeded by: William Sessions (acting)

Personal details
- Education: University of Michigan
- Occupation: Public official

Aditi Hardikar is an American public official who was the acting Assistant Secretary of the Treasury for Management at the United States Department of the Treasury from 2024 to 2025. She was previously Deputy Chief of Staff to Janet Yellen, the U.S. Secretary of the Treasury, the associate director of public engagement in the White House Office of Public Engagement, and the primary liaison to the LGBTQ and AAPI communities during the second term of the Obama administration.

== Early life and education ==
Hardikar is the daughter of immigrants from India. She earned a B.A. in economics and political science from the University of Michigan.

== Career ==
Hardikar helped lead LGBTQ fundraising and outreach efforts on the Barack Obama 2012 presidential campaign. She led fundraising and strategy efforts as the director of the AAPI leadership council and director of the LGBTQ leadership council for the Democratic National Committee. During the second term of the presidency of Barack Obama, Hardikar succeeded Gautam Raghavan as the associate director of public engagement in the White House Office of Public Engagement, serving as the primary liaison to the LGBTQ and AAPI communities for issues including economic opportunity, health care, transgender rights, data collection, and youth homelessness. She was the first woman of color to serve in those roles. Rainbow colors lit up the White House on the evening of June 26, 2015, in celebration of the Obergefell v. Hodges. Hardikar and Jeff Tiller, two White House staffers, first came up with the idea to light up the White House with rainbow colors. In 2016, Hardikar stepped down to serve as the coalitions finance director for the Hillary Clinton 2016 presidential campaign.

Hardikar spent three years at the Obama Foundation, first as chief of staff with a focus on strategic planning and organizational growth, and then as the acting vice president for operations on the development team, overseeing data and analytics, communications, and research. She served as the leadership and training lead for the presidential transition of Joe Biden. In January 2021, Hardikar joined the U.S. Department of the Treasury. She was a senior advisor to Wally Adeyemo, the U.S. deputy secretary of the treasury. In 2022, Hardikar succeeded Alfred Johnson as the deputy chief of staff to Janet Yellen, the U.S. secretary of the treasury. In 2024, Hardikar succeeded Anna Canfield Roth as the acting Assistant Secretary of the Treasury for Management.

== Personal life ==
Hardikar is a member of the LGBT community.
