= Gautam Raghavan =

Indian-American political advisor

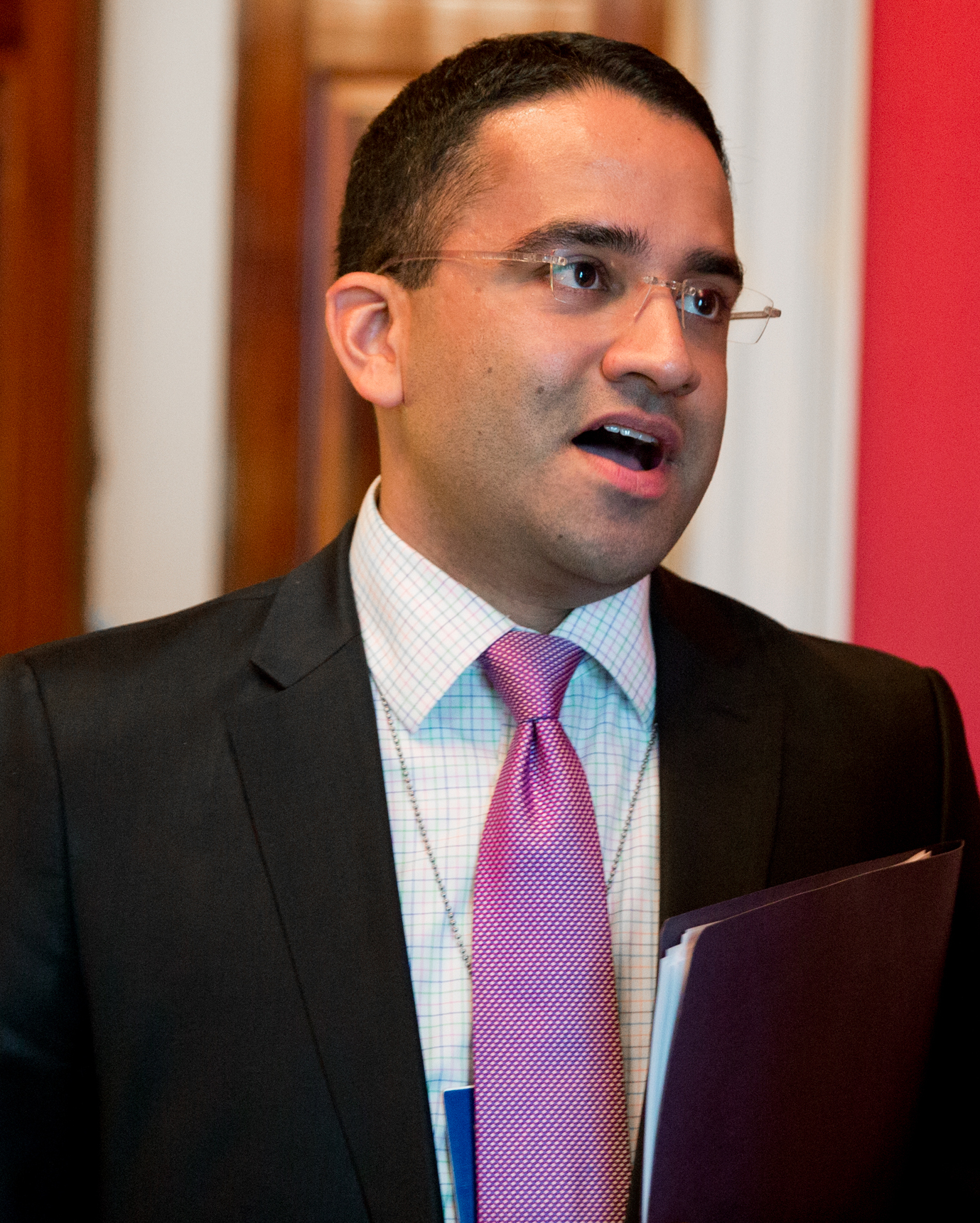

Director of the White House Presidential Personnel Office
- In office January 31, 2022 – January 20, 2025
- President: Joe Biden
- Preceded by: Cathy Russell
- Succeeded by: Sergio Gor

Personal details
- Born: India
- Party: Democratic
- Education: Stanford University (BA); George Washington University (attended)

Gautam Raghavan is a political advisor who was the director of the White House Presidential Personnel Office. Raghavan previously served as the associate director of the Office of Public Liaison in the Obama administration.

== Early life and education ==
Raghavan was born in India and raised in Seattle, Washington. He attended Stanford University, where he was a member of the Stanford Harmonics.

== Career ==
Raghavan was the associate director of the Office of Public Liaison under President Obama, acting as a liaison to both the LGBT and Asian American and Pacific Islander communities from 2011 to 2017.

He has also worked for the Progressive Majority, the 2008 Obama campaign, the Democratic National Committee, the Gill Foundation, and the U.S. Department of Defense as the outreach lead for its "Don't Ask, Don’t Tell" Working Group.

Outside of government, Raghavan has worked as a consultant for progressive organizations including the Biden Foundation and the Indian American Impact Project, an initiative that supports Indian Americans in politics which he founded in 2016. Raghavan was the editor of West Wingers: Stories from the Dream Chasers, Change Makers, and Hope Creators Inside the Obama White House, which includes personal accounts by eighteen Obama Administration staffers.

From December 2018 to July 2020, Raghavan was the chief of staff for Congresswoman Pramila Jayapal. In June 2020, Biden selected Raghavan to serve on his presidential transition team.

== Personal life ==
Raghavan is openly gay. He lives with his husband and daughter in Washington D.C. He is of Tamil descent.
