= Jouar =

Village in Lebanon

Jouar El-Matn
- District
- الجوار
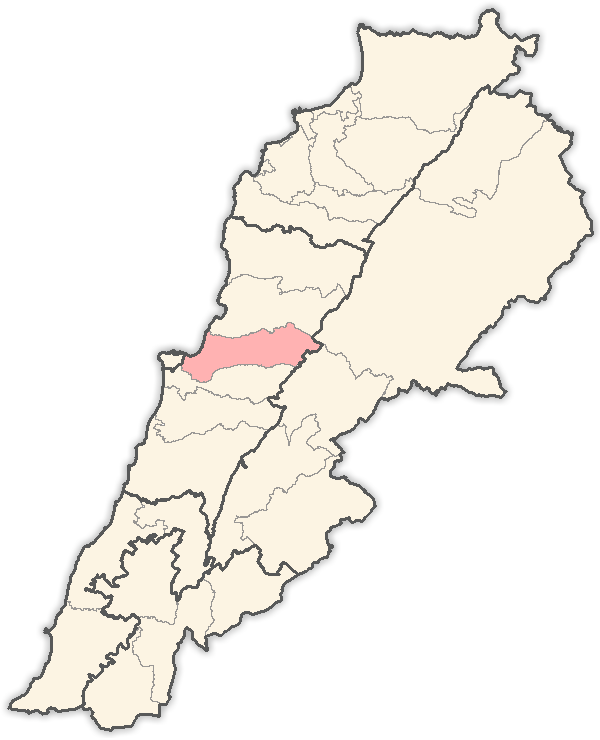
- Location in Lebanon
- Coordinates: 33°55′22″N 35°38′30″E
- Country: Lebanon
- Governorate: Mount Lebanon Governorate

Government
  - Mayor: George E. Samaha

Area
  - Total: 0.37 sq mi (0.96 km^{2})
- Elevation: 3,035 ft (925 m)

Population
  - Total: 879
- Time zone: UTC+2 (EST)
  - Summer (DST): +3
- Area code: 4
- Website: www.aljouar.com

Jouar El-Matn is a village in Lebanon. It is located between Chrine, Chouweir and Khenchara, on the main road to Bteghrine Baskinta, and is 27 kilometres (16.8 mi) north east of Beirut. Covering an area of about .96 square kilometres (0.4 sq mi), this village is known for its traditional red-roofed brick houses.

In the town is the 18th-century church of Saint Nicolas, noted for its iconostasis of wood. In addition to its collection of icons, the monastery is the site of the Middle East's first Arabic printing press, which first appeared in 1734. A five-room museum displays the old presses and some 450 related objects and pieces of equipment. The oldest model displayed was built between 1726 and 1733 by Abdallah el-Zakhir from Aleppo.
