= 1585 Ottoman expedition against the Druze =

Ottoman military campaign against the Druze of the Mount Lebanon region (1585)

Coordinates: 33°41′44″N 35°34′45″E

Date	Summer 1585
Location	The Chouf of Mount Lebanon, Sidon-Beirut Sanjak, Ottoman Empire
Result	Ottoman victory

Belligerents
Ottoman Empire	Druze rebels

Commanders and leaders
Ibrahim Pasha; Mansur ibn Furaykh	Qurqumaz Ma'n †

Strength
~20,000	15,000 to 30,000

Casualties and losses
Unknown	Hundreds
- Location of the Chouf in modern Lebanon

The 1585 Ottoman expedition against the Druze, also called the 1585 Ottoman invasion of the Chouf, was an Ottoman military campaign led by Ibrahim Pasha against the Druze and other chieftains of Mount Lebanon and its environs, then a part of the Sidon-Beirut Sanjak of the province of Damascus Eyalet. It had been traditionally considered the direct consequence of a raid by bandits in Akkar against the tribute caravan of Ibrahim Pasha, then Egypt's outgoing governor, who was on his way to Constantinople. Modern research indicates that the tribute caravan arrived intact and that the expedition was instead the culmination of Ottoman attempts to subjugate the Druze and other tribal groups in Mount Lebanon dating from 1518.

In 1523–1524 dozens of Druze villages were burned in the Chouf area and hundreds of Druze were killed or captured by the governor Khurram Pasha, after which a period of peace ensued. Tensions resumed in the 1560s as Druze and non-Druze local dynasties, particularly the Ma'ns, Assafs and Shihabs, acquired large quantities of prohibited firearms, which were often superior to those possessed by government troops. Military action by the Ottoman governors of Damascus in the 1570s failed to disarm the chiefs and the general population or collect tax arrears, which had been building up from the 1560s.

Ibrahim Pasha was appointed to "rectify the situation" in the Levant in 1583 and launched the expedition against the Druze of Mount Lebanon in the summer of 1585 as a Porte-ordered diversion for his Constantinople-bound caravan. He mobilised about 20,000 soldiers, including the Janissaries of Egypt and Damascus, as well as local chieftains, namely the Bedouin Mansur ibn Furaykh and Druze rivals of the Ma'ns. Hundreds of Druze rebels were slain, thousands of muskets were confiscated and large sums of money were collected as tax arrears by Ibrahim Pasha. The Ma'nid chief Qurqumaz, one of the principal targets of the expedition, died in hiding after refusing to surrender.

The following year the governor of Damascus, Ali Pasha, captured the chieftains of the local Assaf, Harfush, Tanukh and Furaykh dynasties and sent them to Constantinople. They were afterward returned to their home regions and confirmed in their tax farms. The expedition and its aftermath marked a turning point in Ottoman governance of the Levant as local chieftains were thenceforth frequently appointed as sanjak-beys (district governors). One such governor was a son of Qurqumaz, Fakhr al-Din II, who became the most powerful local force in the Levant from the time of his appointments to the sanjaks of Sidon-Beirut and Safad in the 1590s and 1602, respectively, until his downfall in 1633.

== Sources ==
The source used for the 1585 expedition by 19th-century chroniclers from Mount Lebanon and modern historians was the account of the Maronite patriarch and historian Istifan al-Duwayhi, which dates to c. 1668. Duwayhi's version attributes the cause of the campaign to a raid of the Constantinople-bound tribute caravan of Egypt's governor Ibrahim Pasha by bandits in Jun Akkar, a coastal area north of Tripoli. Duwayhi's account was reproduced almost identically by the 19th-century, Lebanon-based chroniclers Haydar al-Shihabi (d. 1835) and Tannus al-Shidyaq (d. 1859). Their accounts were the principal source used for the event by the modern historians Peter Malcolm Holt, Abdul-Karim Rafeq, Kamal Salibi and Muhammad Adnan Bakhit. The year of the caravan raid was cited as 1584 by Duwayhi, and then by Rafeq, Salibi and Bakhit, while Shihabi, and in turn Holt, placed the raid in 1585.

Modern research by the historian Abdul-Rahim Abu-Husayn in the 1980s suggests that the Jun Akkar raid did not occur and that successive government–Druze hostilities from the 1520s onward culminated with the 1585 government expedition. Abu-Husayn based his reassessment of the events on contemporary and near contemporary sources, namely Ottoman government records, the accounts of the Ottoman historian Mustafa Selaniki (d. 1600), the Italian historian and traveller Giovanni Tomasso Minadoi (d. 1615) and the Damascene historians Shams al-Din Muhammad ibn Tulun (d. 1548), al-Hasan al-Burini (d. 1615) and Ahmad al-Qaramani (fl. 1580s–1600s).

== Background ==
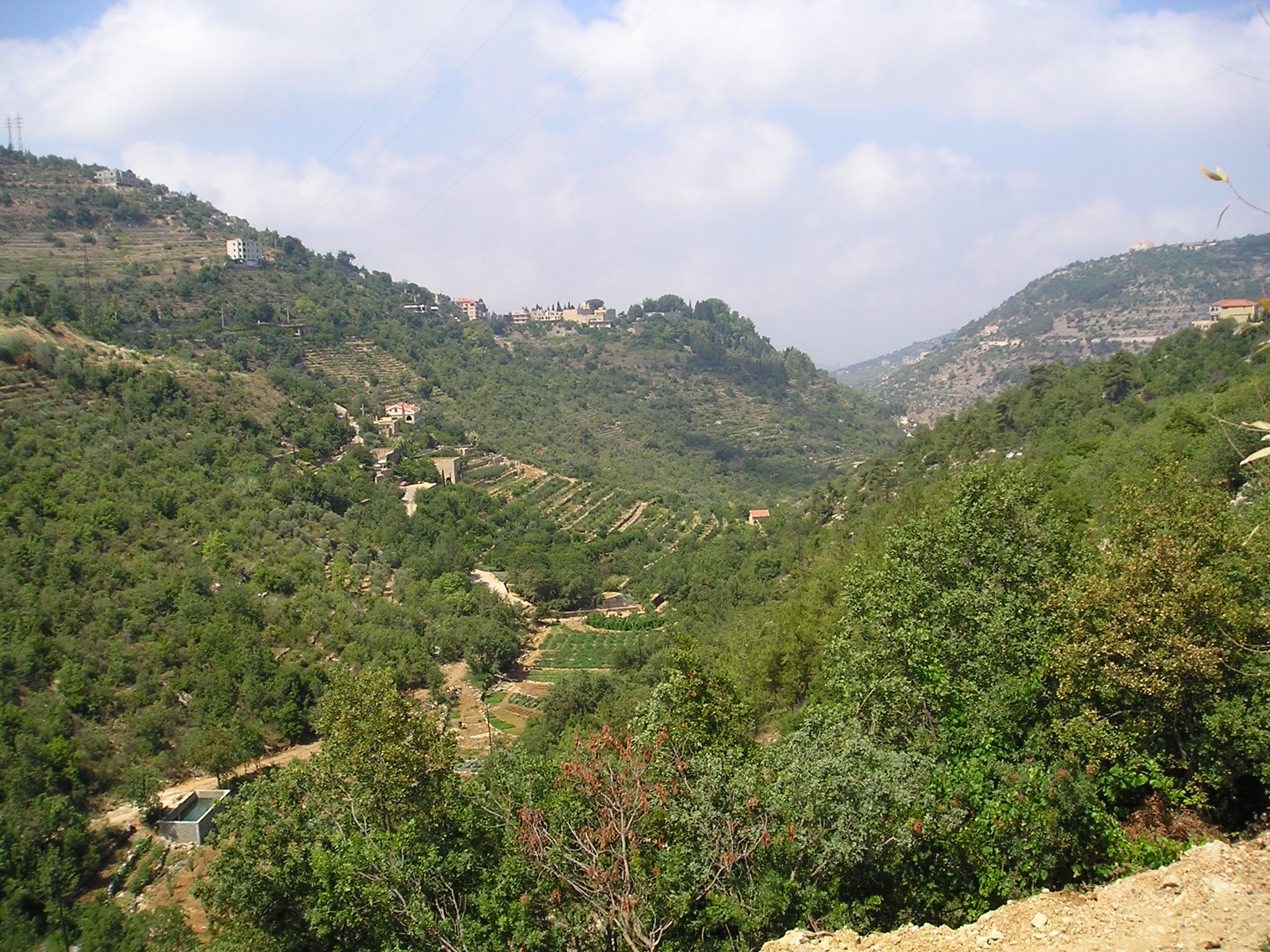
The Chouf mountains

The Ottoman Empire conquered the Levant from the Mamluks following the Battle of Marj Dabiq near Aleppo in 1516. The Ottoman sultan Selim I largely preserved the Mamluk governing structures and officials of the region. His beylerbey (provincial governor) over Damascus, Janbirdi al-Ghazali, had served the same role under the Mamluks. After Janbirdi declared himself sultan following Selim's death in 1520, the Ottomans stamped out his revolt and began to incorporate the Levant more firmly into the empire's structures. The most significant challenge for the Sublime Porte (imperial Ottoman government in Constantinople) in the Levant had been the subjugation of its eastern desert and western mountainous peripheries. Selim had entrusted the pacification of Bedouin tribes and the security of the Hajj pilgrimage route between Damascus and Mecca to the powerful Sunni Muslim Bedouin dynasties of the Beqaa Valley and Jabal Nablus, the Hanash and Tarabay, respectively.

The area of Mount Lebanon and the port towns of Sidon and Beirut became administratively part of the Sidon-Beirut Sanjak, a district of Damascus Eyalet. Sidon-Beirut was divided into the nahiyas (subdistricts) of Beirut and Sidon along the coast, and the following nine nahiyas in the mountainous parts of the sanjak: from north to south, the Keserwan, the Matn, the Jurd, the Gharb, Iqlim al-Kharrub, three nahiyas collectively known as the Chouf and Iqlim al-Tuffah. The nahiyas of the Matn, the Jurd, the Gharb and the Chouf were predominantly inhabited by Druze, followers of an 11th-century offshoot of Isma'ili Shia Islam. The Druze tribesmen of southern Mount Lebanon proved challenging for the authorities to pacify, and a provincial law code from Sultan Suleiman's reign (1520–1566) referenced them as a "misguided folk where each follows his own cult" and from whom tax collection was difficult.

The Druze were officially considered Muslims by the Ottomans for taxation purposes, though they were not viewed as genuine Muslims by the authorities or the Sunni Muslim ulema (religious establishment). Members of the community had to pretend to be of the Sunni Muslim faith to attain any official post, were occasionally forced to pay the jizya (poll tax) reserved for Christians and Jews, and were the target of condemnatory treatises and fatwas (edicts) by the ulema of Damascus. The Druze were likewise suspicious of the Ottomans. In their consistent efforts to counter their incorporation into the administrative and fiscal system, the Druze benefited from a rugged terrain, possession of firearms and sectarian and tribal cohesion, making it difficult to impose government authority in the Druze areas. Consequently, the Ottoman presence in the Druze areas, as well as the non-Druze nahiyas of Sidon-Beirut, was negligible for much of the 16th and 17th centuries, during which time local chieftains, Druze and Muslim alike, governed the area through iltizam (limited-term tax farms). Ostensibly, the appointed holders of iltizams, called multazims, were to remit taxes to the government and undertake official military duties; the local multazims did neither and were more powerful than the occasional government-appointed sanjak-bey (district governor).

=== Druze–Ottoman hostilities before 1585 ===
The first known government action against the Druze occurred in 1518 during the rebellion of Nasir al-Din, the Hanash chieftain and the sanjak-bey of Sidon-Beirut, against Selim. The rebellion was suppressed by Janbirdi, who arrested and executed Nasir al-Din and captured the latter's Druze allies, the chiefs Qurqumaz, Zayn al-Din and Alam al-Din Sulayman from the Chouf-based Ma'n family and Sharaf al-Din Yahya of the Gharb-based Tanukh-Buhtur family. The four Druze chiefs were released after paying a heavy fine.

The beylerbey of Damascus, Khurram Pasha, launched a punitive expedition against the Chouf Druze led by the Ma'nid chiefs in 1523. Forty-three Druze villages, including Barouk, the headquarters of Qurqumaz, were burned and Ibn Tulun reported that Khurram Pasha returned to Damascus with four camel loads of Druze heads and Druze religious literature proving the religion's hostility to Sunni Islam. The expedition represented the first attempt to impose direct government authority in the Chouf. Khurram Pasha followed up by appointing subashis (police superintendents) to enforce law and order in the area, but they were killed by the Druze. Khurram Pasha responded by launching a second punitive expedition against the Chouf on 18 June 1524, during which thirty villages were burned and the beylerbey returned the next day with three camel loads of Druze heads and 300 Druze women and children captives. The campaigns were lauded by the contemporary ulema and poets of Damascus. There are no further mentions of Druze rebellions or government expeditions in the sources until the late 16th century.

Tensions between the Druze and the Porte rose considerably as the Druze, along with other tribal and sectarian groups in Syria, acquired firearms which were at times superior to the firearms used by the Ottoman armies. The possession of firearms by non-military subjects was forbidden, though the authorities faced difficulties enforcing the ban in Syria. The Syrians obtained at least part of their arsenals from European powers intent on destabilising Ottoman rule in Syria. The arsenals were provided using mercantile ships which docked in the Syrian ports. Other sources included the Janissaries of Damascus, the timar (fief)-holders in Syria and Ottoman ships from Constantinople which came to transport grain from Syria to the imperial capital. Druze armed with long muskets attacked officials sent to collect the taxes from their sub-districts and repulsed the subsequent Ottoman raid against them at Ain Dara in 1565.

In an order by the Porte to the beylerbey of Damascus in August 1574, it is mentioned that the villagers of the Gharb, Jurd, Chouf and Matn owed tax arrears dating over twenty years and that the muqaddams (chieftains) of the Druze possessed large quantities of muskets; the muqaddams named in the order were the Ma'nid Qurqumaz, possibly the grandson of the above-mentioned Qurqumaz, the Tanukhid Sharaf al-Din and the non-Druze chieftains Mansur ibn Hasan of the Keserwan-based Assaf family and Qasim of the Wadi al-Taym-based Shihab family. The beylerbey was ordered to collect at least 6,000 muskets from the named chieftains and more from each household of the named subdistricts. The combined forces of the beylerbey of Damascus, the imperial Damascene Janissaries, the sanjak-bey of Tripoli, and an Ottoman fleet launched an expedition against the Druze that year, but they were unable to subdue and disarm them.

The imperial order from 1574 was renewed in February 1576, but the beylerbey of Damascus was again unable to execute the order rather complaining that the inhabitants of the Gharb, Jurd, Chouf and Matn remained in a state of rebellion, that no multazim was willing to accept the tax farm for the subdistricts and appointed emins (tax collectors) were disrespected by the populace. The Porte consequently ordered that the beylerbey destroy an unspecified number of Druze villages, arrest and punish their muqaddams and collect the tax arrears. No military action was taken and the Druze continued to defy the authorities and were reported by the government to have acquired further muskets in 1582. In that year they were accused of collaborating with the Druze and Shia Muslims of the Safad Sanjak, south of Sidon-Beirut, and the Porte's order called for "get[ting] rid of [Qurqumaz] ibn Ma'n, whose trouble and evil deeds exceed all others".

=== Prelude ===
Al-Qaramani wrote that the vizier Ibrahim Pasha was sent to Egypt and Syria in 1583 to "rectify the situation [there]". On 12 February 1585 an imperial order issued to the beylerbey of Damascus, Uveys Pasha, reaffirmed that Qurqumaz was "a rebellious chieftain ... who has gathered [around him] miscreants in the Druze community and done harm and mischief in the sanjak of Safad". Ibrahim Pasha arrived in Damascus with a tribute caravan from Egypt and a large military escort in June. He was instructed by the Porte to subdue the Druze of Mount Lebanon. On 31 August Uveys Pasha was ordered by the Porte to cooperate with Ibrahim Pasha against the Bedouin and the Druze who had rebelled throughout Damascus Eyalet, causing damage and attacking highways. Abu-Husayn views the constant state of rebellion by the Druze and the general insubordination of chieftains in parts of Syria where the government had been unable to exercise authority as the direct cause of Ibrahim Pasha's expedition.

== Expedition and follow up campaigns ==
Ibrahim Pasha's army consisted of the Janissaries of Egypt and Damascus, and his troops numbered about 20,000. The versions of Duwayhi and Shihabi, which add the troops of Aleppo Eyalet and Cyprus Eyalet to the expeditionary force, hold that Ibrahim Pasha's troops encamped in an area called Marj Armush and the size of the Ottoman force alone "frightened all the Arab lands". The Ottoman troops and their local backers blocked the roads to the coast and the Beqaa Valley and killed about 500 Druze elders. Government records confirm Ibrahim Pasha killed hundreds of Druze rebels, sent many of their heads to Constantinople and had "thus punished the rebellious community properly". Numerous villages in the Chouf were plundered and Qurqumaz went into hiding in a cave and died. The Druze and others were disarmed and tax arrears were collected, with al-Burini reporting that Ibrahim Pasha confiscated thousands of muskets and large sums of money from the Druze.

Ibrahim Pasha used Mansur ibn Furaykh as his guide. Ibn Furaykh was a Sunni Bedouin chieftain of the Beqaa Valley and local enemy of Qurqumaz who had a reputation of hostility toward the Druze and Shias; the role attributed to Ibn Furaykh of persuading the vizier to launch the campaign by the 19th-century chroniclers was without foundation, according to Abu-Husayn. During the expedition, a number of Ma'nids and other Druze chieftains, including the Alam al-Dins of the Matn and the Sharaf al-Dins of the Gharb defected to Ibrahim Pasha, along with a significant proportion of Qurqumaz's men. Ibrahim Pasha arrived in Constantinople later in 1585. According to Minadoi's account he entered the Golden Horn with 24 galleys and received a welcome by a volley of artillery fire from the Topkapi Palace and large crowds. In contradiction to Duwayhi's account of the tribute having been robbed, contemporary accounts indicate it arrived in Constantinople with about 300,000–1,000,000 piasters, 173,000 gold pieces, an emerald throne for Sultan Murad III (r. 1574–1595), Arabian horses, an elephant and a giraffe.

After the expedition, in the same year, the Sidon-Beirut Sanjak was detached from Damascus Eyalet and became part of Tripoli Eyalet, which was established in 1579. The beylerbey of Tripoli from 1579, the local chieftain of the Akkar area Yusuf Sayfa Pasha, was concomitantly dismissed, likely because of suspicions that he would compromise the government's interests for local considerations. His replacement, the veteran Ottoman commander Ja'far Pasha al-Tuwashi, was entrusted with continuing Ibrahim Pasha's suppression of the rebellion in Mount Lebanon. Yusuf Sayfa may have resisted his dismissal, as according to Duwayhi his territory in Akkar was raided by Ja'far Pasha. The latter was reassigned to the Safavid front within a few months and without his iron grip the territory of Sidon-Beirut drifted out of Tripoli's control and, in practice, reverted to Damascene oversight. Although Duwayhi's version holds that a number of Syrian chieftains were captured in Ibrahim Pasha's expedition and brought to Constantinople, contemporary sources indicate most of the chieftains were captured in a follow-up campaign by Ali Pasha ibn Alwan, Ibrahim Pasha's appointee as beylerbey of Damascus, in 1586. Among the captive chieftains were Muhammad, the Ghazir-based son and successor of the Assaf chieftain Mansur, Muhammad ibn Jamal al-Din and Mundhir, the respective Tanukhid chiefs of Aramoun and Abeih, Ali al-Harfush, the Shia chieftain of Baalbek, and Ibn Furaykh. The chieftains were well received in Constantinople and shortly after sent back to their respective territories with confirmations of their iltizam.

== Aftermath ==
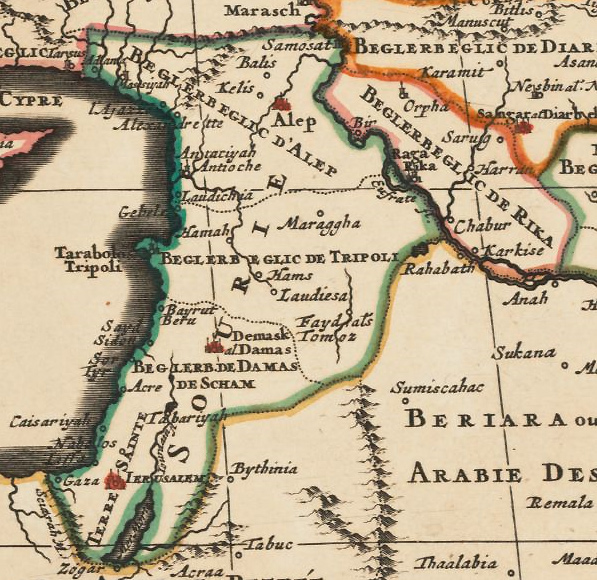
Map of 17th-century Ottoman Syria, showing the eyalets of Damascus, Tripoli, Aleppo and Rakka.

The 1585–1586 events marked a turning point in the history of Mount Lebanon and the Levant in general under Ottoman rule. The Ottomans began to entrust local chieftains with the policing and taxation of the region by appointing them over the sanjaks of the region and granting them the title of bey (Turkish equivalent to the Arabic emir). Qurqumaz's son Fakhr al-Din II was appointed sanjak-bey of Sidon-Beirut in the early 1590s and was additionally assigned Safad Sanjak in 1602. Fakhr al-Din combined lucrative commercial ties with the Italians, a privately funded army of sekbans (musketeers), and support from Ottoman officialdom, which he guaranteed through bribes and prompt payment of taxes, to establish himself as the most powerful chieftain of the Levant until his downfall in 1633. Ali al-Harfush, who had been appointed sanjak-bey of Homs in 1585, was kept in his post during his exile in Constantinople and returned to his Baalbek headquarters by 1589. He was executed c. 1590 but his son Musa succeeded him in Baalbek and was appointed sanjak-bey of Homs in 1592.

The historian Stefan Winter places the 1585 expedition within the context of imperial changes to the military and fiscal structures of the Levant in the late 16th century, which included the creation of the hybrid eyalet of Tripoli in 1579, which combined the military appendage sanjak of Jabala with the tax revenue-driven sanjaks of Sidon-Beirut, Homs and Salamiyah, which were governed by local chieftains and did not contribute troops for war. About the same time the Porte also began to grant lands along the upper Euphrates valley to Ottoman officers and loyal Bedouin chieftains and in 1586 created the Rakka Eyalet all toward exerting greater control of the desert interior of the Levant.

== Bibliography ==
- Abu-Husayn, Abdul-Rahim (1985a). "The Ottoman Invasion of the Shūf in 1585: A Reconsideration". Al-Abhath. 32: 13–21.
- Abu-Husayn, Abdul-Rahim (1985b). Provincial Leaderships in Syria, 1575-1650. Beirut: American University of Beirut. ISBN 9780815660729.
- Abu-Husayn, Abdul-Rahim (November 1992). "Problems in the Ottoman Administration in Syria during the 16th and 17th Centuries: The Case of the Sanjak of Sidon-Beirut". International Journal of Middle East Studies. 24 (4): 665–675. doi:10.1017/S002074380002239X. JSTOR 164441. S2CID 159670509.
- Abu-Husayn, Abdul-Rahim (2004). The View from Istanbul: Lebanon and the Druze Emirate in the Ottoman Chancery Documents, 1546–1711. Oxford and New York: The Centre for Lebanese Studies and I. B. Tauris. ISBN 1-86064-856-8.
- Bakhit, Muhammad Adnan Salamah (February 1972). The Ottoman Province of Damascus in the Sixteenth Century (PhD). School of Oriental and African Studies, University of London.
- Harris, William (2012). Lebanon: A History, 600–2011. New York: Oxford University Press. ISBN 978-0-19-518-111-1.
- Salibi, Kamal (June 1967). "Northern Lebanon under the Dominance of Ġazīr (1517–1591)". Arabica. 14 (2): 144–166. doi:10.1163/157005867X00029. JSTOR 4055631.
- Winter, Stefan (2010). The Shiites of Lebanon under Ottoman Rule, 1516–1788. Cambridge University Press. ISBN 9781139486811.
