= Mundhir al-Tanukhi =

Mundhir ibn Alam al-Din Sulayman ibn Muhammad (fl. 1556 – c. 1624), also known as Mundhir al-Tanukhi (alternate transliterations: Monzer, Munzir or Mounzer) was a Buhturid emir of the Gharb district in Mount Lebanon and the subdistrict governor (zabit) of Beirut in 1616–1623. He was a maternal uncle of Fakhr al-Din II.

== Background and family ==
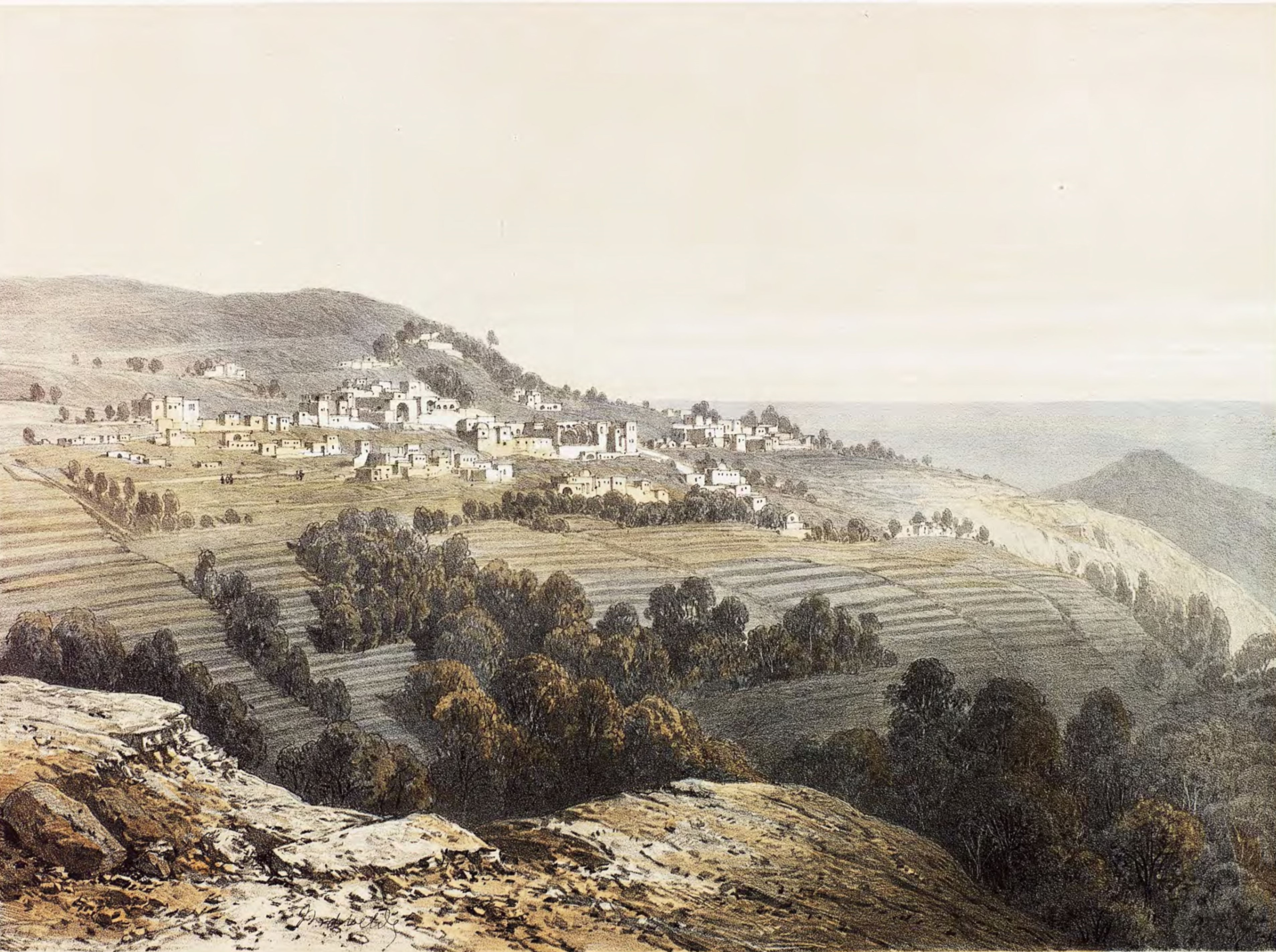
Sketch of the village of Abeih (1857), the headquarters of Mundhir and his family, the Buhturid emirs of the Gharb district in Mount Lebanon

Mundhir was a traditional emir (prince or commander) of the Buhturids (commonly known as the Tanukh), a family of Arab stock established since the 11th century as the commanders of the Gharb area immediately east of Beirut in central Mount Lebanon. He hailed from the branch of the family based in Abeih (the other was based in Aramoun). He was likely the grandson of Nasir al-Din Muhammad, who served as the multazim (limited-term tax farmer) of the port of Beirut in 1567–1569 for the Ottoman Empire, which conquered the area in 1516. Nasir al-Din Muhammad's father Sayf al-Din Abu Bakr (d. 1492) held the mashaykha (paramount religious leadership) of the Druze of Mount Lebanon, having succeeded his Buhturid kinsman al-Sayyid al-Tanukhi in the spiritual office. Sayf al-Din Abu Bakr's father was Izz al-Din Sadaqa, the second and last Buhturid to be appointed mutawali (governor) of Beirut during Mamluk rule (1291–1516), serving for an undetermined period during the reign of Sultan Barsbay (r. 1422–1438).

In 1556 Mundhir was wed to Jalila bint Jamal al-Din Ahmad, a woman of the Arslans, a family of emirs long-established in the Gharb village of Choueifat and distantly related to the Buhturids. In that same year his sister Jamila was wed to Jalila's brother Muhammad ibn Jamal al-Din. Mundhir's other sister, known in the sources as Sitt Nasab, was married to Qurqumaz ibn Yunus, an emir of the Ma'ns, an emirate family of the Druze in the Chouf area of Mount Lebanon south of the Gharb. Sitt Nasab mothered Fakhr al-Din II, who succeeded his father Qurqumaz as head of the Ma'ns six years after his father died in the Ottoman punitive campaign against the Druze in 1585–1586. During the six years following the campaign, Fakhr al-Din had been under the protection of Mundhir's brother Sayf al-Din in the Gharb.

== Career ==
In 1585 Mundhir was appointed the multazim of the port of Beirut. During the Ottoman campaign that year he was arrested by the campaign's commander, the vizier Ibrahim Pasha, and sent to Constantinople, capital of the empire. He was still reported detained in Constantinople in 1586 by the Italian historian Minadoi, but was soon after released and reinstated as multazim of the port of Beirut. His nephew Fakhr al-Din II became the sanjak-bey (district governor) of the Sidon-Beirut Sanjak in 1593 and continued to hold the post directly or by proxy through his son Ali until 1613. That year, the Ottomans launched a punitive expedition against the Ma'ns, prompting Fakhr al-Din's escape to Tuscany. The Ma'ns were dispossessed of their tax farms and governorships, except for the Chouf. Ali was reinstalled as governor of Sidon-Beirut in 1615 and the Ma'ns defeated a coalition of local rivals, namely the Tripoli-based Sayfas and their Druze backers, the Alam al-Dins of the Jurd, the Sawwafs of the Matn, and Mundhir's brother-in-law Muhammad ibn Jamal al-Din of Choueifat.

After defeating rival Druze, the Ma'ns installed their Buhturid maternal kinsmen Mundhir to the tax farm of Beirut and Sayf al-Din's son Nasir al-Din the tax farms of the Gharb and the Jurd. During the fighting in 1613, the Ottomans razed Mundhir's residence in the Na'imeh area of Beirut, after which he handed it over to Ali Ma'n. The latter had requested control of it, viewing the residence as a strategic position to oversee activity by Druze rivals in the Gharb, Jurd and Matn. He had it restored and garrisoned. Mundhir sent a delegation to Ali Ma'n in Sidon to retrieve ownership of the property, but the delegates were rebuffed. They threatened that should Ali Ma'n deny their request, they would not support him in future confrontations. In response, Ali mobilized his men and mercenaries from the Chouf and Safed and took over the tower of Mundhir's father-in-law, Jamal al-Din, in Beirut to pressure the Buhturids to drop their request. While the delegates were still in Sidon, news reached them that Fakhr al-Din had returned from exile and they consequently dropped the matter. In addition to the tax farm of Beirut, Mundhir had also been appointed as zabit (subdistrict governor) of Beirut by Ali Ma'n in 1616 and 1618. He was confirmed in the post in 1623–1624.

Mundhir's family, the Buhturids of Abeih, were all killed in 1633, following the downfall and capture of Fakhr al-Din II by the Ottomans. They were lured into a meeting in Abeih by Ali Alam al-Din, who had been appointed by the Ottomans to replace the Ma'ns in their tax farms in Mount Lebanon. Once gathered, they were ambushed and killed. Mundhir is not mentioned among the slain, and may have died before then. The killed Buhturids were Nasir al-Din, his son Sayf al-Din, the elder Yahya al-Aqil, a certain Mahmud, and three young sons of these men.

== Building works ==
Mundhir built a tower and a saray (government residence) in Abeih in 1576. While governor of Beirut, in 1620, he built a congregational mosque which still bears his name, the Emir Munzer Mosque, located in the city's commercial center. The journalist Samir Kassir called it "a small jewel of a mosque" and "the principal architectural legacy of Fakhr al-Din's era [in Beirut]".

== Bibliography ==
- Abu-Husayn, Abdul-Rahim (1985). Provincial Leaderships in Syria, 1575–1650. Beirut: American University of Beirut. ISBN 9780815660729. OCLC 242675094.
- Harris, William (2012). Lebanon: A History, 600–2011. New York: Oxford University Press. ISBN 978-0-19-518-111-1.
- Hourani, Alexander (2010). New Documents on the History of Mount Lebanon and Arabistan in the 10th and 11th Centuries H. Beirut.
- Kassir, Samir (2010). Beirut. Berkely and Los Angeles: University of California Press. ISBN 978-0-520-27126-5.
- Salibi, Kamal S. (January 1961). "The Buḥturids of the Garb. Mediaeval Lords of Beirut and of Southern Lebanon". Arabica. 8 (1): 74–97. doi:10.1163/157005861X00043. JSTOR 4054971.
- Salibi, K. (July 1973). "The Secret of the House of Ma'n". International Journal of Middle East Studies. 4 (3): 272–287. doi:10.1017/S0020743800031469. ISSN 0020-7438. JSTOR 162160. S2CID 163020137.
