= Elvendoglu Ali Pasha =

16th century Ottoman statesman and beylerbey (governor-general)

Elvendoğlu Ali Pasha, known in Arabic as Ali Pasha ibn Alwan, was an Ottoman statesman. He was appointed the beylerbey (governor-general) of Damascus Eyalet by the vizier Ibrahim Pasha in October 1585, the same month in which a certain Husrev Pasha was appointed to the same post by the Sublime Porte (Ottoman imperial government in Constantinople; the Porte abrogated Husrev Pasha's assignment, appointing him instead to Baghdad Eyalet. Ali Pasha was charged with continuing Ibrahim Pasha's suppression of Druze and other rebels in Mount Lebanon and its environs, and was responsible for the capture of several chieftains, including Muhammad Assaf, Ali Harfush, Mansur ibn Furaykh and chiefs of the Tanukhs, all of whom were sent to Constantinople. He was replaced as beylerbey by his predecessor Uveys Pasha in June 1586. Ali Pasha was appointed beylerbey of Baghdad Eyalet for a few days in late 1586.

== Bibliography ==
- Abu-Husayn, Abdul-Rahim (1985). Provincial Leaderships in Syria, 1575-1650. Beirut: American University of Beirut. ISBN 9780815660729.
- Fleischer, Cornell H. (1986). Bureaucrat and Intellectual in the Ottoman Empire: The Historian Mustafa Ali (1541-1600). Princeton: Princeton University Press. ISBN 0-691-05464-9.
- Salibi, Kamal (June 1967). "Northern Lebanon under the Dominance of Ġazīr (1517–1591)". Arabica. 14 (2): 144–166. doi:10.1163/157005867X00029. JSTOR 4055631.
