= Mansur ibn Furaykh =

Ottoman Emir of the Biqa'a, Safad and Ajlun districts (died 1593)

Mansur Bey ibn Furaykh
- Monarch: Murad III

Amir al-Hajj
- In office 1590–1591
- Preceded by: Qansuh al-Ghazzawi
- Succeeded by: Farrukh Pasha

Sanjak-Bey of Nablus
- In office 1589–1593

Sanjak-Bey of Safad
- In office 1589–1593
- In office 1583–1585
- Preceded by: Huseyn Pasha

Sanjak-Bey of Ajlun
- In office 1589–1593
- Preceded by: Qansuh al-Ghazzawi

Personal details
- Born: Biqa'a, Damascus Eyalet, Ottoman Empire
- Died: 7 December 1593 Damascus, Damascus Eyalet, Ottoman Empire
- Children: Korkmaz; Nasrallah; Mansur; Muhammad

Mansur Bey ibn Furaykh (died 7 December 1593) was Emir of the Biqa'a, Safad and Ajlun districts in the late 16th century during Ottoman rule. The Ottomans granted Mansur this large power base to enable him to check the growing power of rebellious Lebanese clans, namely the Ma'an and Harfush. However, complaints were lodged against him alleging that he oppressed his subjects, and killed and robbed wealthy Muslim pilgrims during his service as amir al-hajj. Mansur also failed to pay the Ottoman authorities the taxes they were due from his sanjaks. Because of these actions, Mansur was arrested and executed.

== Biography ==
Mansur came from Bedouin stock and possibly worked as a barn-man for the Bani al-Hansh, a Sunni Muslim clan that controlled the Biqa'a nahiya (subdistrict) of the Damascus Sanjak of Damascus Eyalet. Together with a local sheikh named Ibn Shihab, Mansur and 3,000 of his men looted several villages in the nahiya of Acre in 1573, killing between 50–60 local residents in the process. Consequently, an arrest order for Mansur was issued by the court of Sultan Selim II, but Mansur was not apparently punished.

In 1581, Mansur was appointed as the amir al-hajj (commander of the Hajj) for the Hajj pilgrim caravan departing Damascus for Mecca. In May 1583, Mansur was given control of Safad Sanjak by the district's governor, Huseyin Pasha, because the latter was reassigned to Jerusalem Sanjak to quell Bedouin disturbances there. Mansur continued to hold Safad until September 1585.

By 1585, Mansur had emerged as the strongman of the Biqa'a nahiya. The Ottoman authorities permitted him to rise to the position due to fears that the often-rebellious Ma'an or Harfush clans of Chouf and Baalbek, respectively, would gain control of Biqa'a. The Ma'ans were Druze and the Harfush were Shia Muslim. Mansur was known to be a devoted practitioner and champion of Sunni Islam who had a hatred of the Druze and Shia. During an Ottoman military campaign against the Ma'ans in the Chouf, Mansur served as a guide for the Ottoman commander and former governor of Egypt, Ibrahim Pasha. Later that year, Emir Husayn ibn Sayfa of Tripoli in Lebanon, who was being pursued by the authorities, took refuge with Mansur. The Ottomans sent Mansur a decree demanding Husayn's immediate arrest and handover to the authorities.

Mansur was appointed amir al-hajj in 1589 and 1590, according to historian Muhammad Adnan Bakhit, however, historian Tarif Khalidi asserts he served as amir al-hajj in 1590 and 1591. Upon his return to Syria, he was officially appointed the multazem of his Biqa'a stronghold, as well as the sanjak-bey (district governor) of the Nablus, Safad and Ajlun sanjaks (districts) for four consecutive years. In return, Mansur's obligation to the Ottoman authorities was prompt payment of the annual taxes collected from his districts and the successful protection and the provisioning of the annual Hajj caravan to Mecca.

Initially, Mansur based himself in Safad and directly administered that sanjak, whose majority population was Shia. However, he mostly resided in Damascus or in the Biqa'a village of Qabb Ilyas, where he built palatial homes for himself using forced labor. He delegated one of his sons to administer Nablus, a close partisan named Cherkes Ali in Ajlun and another close partisan in Biqa'a. He had apparent help from local janissaries to enforce his authority in the sanjaks and nahiyas he controlled and to collect taxes from their inhabitants.

According to historians from his era, Mansur oppressed and killed many of the inhabitants in the districts he governed and destroyed several villages. Moreover, he incompetently administered his sanjaks, and neglected or was unable to pay the authorities the taxes that he owed them. While he was praised and rewarded by the imperial authorities for successfully leading the Hajj caravan in 1590, he was admonished for his actions serving the role in 1591, after an accusation that he had "killed rich pilgrims in secret and seized their money". In addition, the powerful Ma'anid Emir Fakhr ad-Din II of Chouf probably lobbied the beylerbey (provincial governor) of Damascus to end Emir Mansur's rule. In mid-1593, Mansur was arrested and imprisoned. Sometime later, the beylerbey was given an imperial order mandating a death sentence for Mansur. Mansur was executed on 7 December 1593.

== Legacy ==
In 1594, Mansur's son Korkmaz, who had been released from his imprisonment at Damascus in 1592, attempted to flee to Tripoli and seek refuge with the Sayfa clan, the Furaykhs' allies. Korkmaz was being pursued by the authorities. At the request of the beylerbey of Damascus, Murad Pasha, Fakhr ad-Din and his ally Musa ibn Harfush, enemies of the Furaykhs, captured and killed Korkmaz and 150 of his men in the Biqa'a while they were on their way to Tripoli.

Following Mansur's death, his brother Murad ibn Furaykh inherited Mansur's headquarters at Qabb Ilyas. In 1609, the Druze sheikh, Ali Jumblatt, captured Qabb Ilyas during a rebellion against the authorities in Damascus. Not long after, Emir Fakhr ad-Din II took control of the area, prompting Murad to obtain a decree from the Grand Vizier in Constantinople, Murad Pasha, restoring Mansur's properties to the Furaykh family. However, Emir Fakhr ad-Din refused to hand over the property, namely Mansur's residence, to Murad. After Murad's death, Yunus ibn Harfush was in control of the Biqa'a (Fakhr ad-Din was living in exile), and refused to hand over the residence to Mansur's sons Nasrallah, Mansur and Muhammad, claiming he purchased the home or that the home belonged to Fakhr ad-Din. The Ottoman authorities continued to back the Furaykhs' demands for the return of their Qabb Ilyas properties until at least November 1615, when a decree was issued ordering the Damascus authorities to settle the matter.

== Bibliography ==
- Abu-Husayn, Abdul-Rahim (2004). The View from Istanbul: Ottoman Lebanon and the Druze Emirate. I.B.Tauris. ISBN 9781860648564.
- Bakhit, Muhammad Adnan (1982). The Ottoman Province of Damascus in the Sixteenth Century. Librairie du Liban. ISBN 9780866853224.
- Harris, William (2012). Lebanon: A History, 600–2011. OUP USA. ISBN 9780195181111.
- Khalidi, Tarif (1984). Land Tenure and social Transformation in the Middle East. American University of Beirut.
- Sluglett, Peter; Weber, Stefan (2010). Syria and Bilad Al-Sham Under Ottoman Rule. BRILL. ISBN 9789004181939.
- Winter, Stefan (2010). The Shiites of Lebanon under Ottoman Rule, 1516–1788. Cambridge University Press. ISBN 9781139486811.
