= Sidon-Beirut Sanjak =

District of Sidon Province of the Ottoman Empire

Sidon-Beirut Sanjak was a sanjak (district) of Sidon Eyalet (Province of Sidon) of the Ottoman Empire. Prior to 1660, the Sidon-Beirut Sanjak had been part of Damascus Eyalet, and for brief periods in the 1590s, Tripoli Eyalet.

== Territory and demographics ==
The Sidon-Beirut Sanjak consisted of the roughly 60-kilometer-strip of territory between the gorge of al-Muamalatayn (just north of Juniyah) to the Zahrani River. The gorge of al-Muamalatayn marked its northern boundary with Tripoli Eyalet, the Zahrani River marked its southern boundary with Safed Sanjak and the Beqaa Valley ridge marked its eastern boundary with Damascus Eyalet. The Sidon-Beirut Sanjak included the coastal towns of Sidon and Beirut, both of which were the center of their own nahiyas (subdistricts), and it included the southern Mount Lebanon range. Its interior nahiyas were, from north to south, Kisrawan and Matn in the Jabal Sannin mountains, Gharb and Jurd in the Jabal al-Kanisah mountains and Iqlim al-Kharrub and Shuf in the Jabal al-Baruk mountains. The population was religiously diverse, with Sunni Muslims being predominant in Sidon, Beirut and Iqlim al-Kharrub, Druze predominating in Matn, Gharb, Jurd and Shuf and Shia Muslims and Maronite Christians inhabiting Kisrawan. Maronites and to a lesser extent, other Christians, increasingly immigrated into the Druze-dominated areas throughout the 17th and 18th centuries.

== History ==
After the Ottoman Empire conquered Syria from the Mamluks in 1516, they formed the Damascus Eyalet (Province of Damascus) out of the Mamluk provinces of central and southern Syria, including the wilayas (districts) of Sidon and Beirut. The latter two places were administratively merged to form the sanjak (district) of Sidon-Beirut. For much of the 16th and 17th centuries, Sidon-Beirut Sanjak was under the jurisdiction of Damascus and, at times during the 1590s, Tripoli. Its first sanjak-bey (district governor) was Ibn al-Hanash, a powerful Arab chieftain active under the Mamluks. He ruled Sidon-Beirut in cooperation with his Druze associates, three of whom came from the Ma'n clan and the fourth from the Tanukh clan. In 1518, Ibn al-Hanash revolted against Ottoman sultan Selim I while he was still in Syria, but was defeated and executed. His associates were arrested and heavily fined. As a sanjak, Sidon-Beirut ostensibly functioned as a military-administrative unit with its own governor and troops. However, at the practical level, Sidon-Beirut's governors held little sway in the sanjak, which was dominated by local chieftains. The latter held iltizam (tax farms) from which they profited, but owing to their autonomous power, they did not pay taxes to the authorities and take part in military duties on behalf of the state.

Until the mid-17th century, Ottoman rule in Sidon-Beirut was largely nominal, especially in the Druze-dominated mountainous areas. The Druze were a heterodox Muslim sect considered by the Ottoman authorities and the Sunni Muslim ulama of Damascus as heretics. Thus, the Druze were officially outside the millet system, neither classified as Muslims nor protected by dhimmi (protected) status such as Christians or Jews. The authorities occasionally levied poll taxes on the Druze, similar to the jizyah imposed on Christians and Jews. In general, the Druze utilized the rugged topography in which they lived and their abundant arsenals to stave off Ottoman attempts to impose their authority over the interior regions of Sidon-Beirut. They revolted numerous times against the Ottoman authorities in Damascus when the latter sought to impose law and order in the sanjak.

In 1523, the Ma'n chieftain revolted against the Ottomans, prompting a punitive expedition by the governor of Damascus, Khurram Pasha, during which the Ma'n's throne village, Baruk, and forty-three other villages were burned down. The same governor led a tax collection expedition in 1524, destroying a further thirty villages. Armed conflict continued intermittently, and in 1545, the authorities in Damascus, lured the Ma'n chieftain, Yunis, to Damascus and killed him. In 1565, the Druze ambushed and routed an Ottoman cavalry regiment sent to collect taxes from Jurd. For the next two decades, Druze defiance mounted and was successively met with Ottoman attempts to impose their authority. In 1585, Sultan Murad III resolved to launch an all-out war effort to subjugate the Druze of Sidon-Beirut and its environs and commanded the governor of Egypt Eyalet, Damat Ibrahim Pasha, to lead the effort. Ibrahim Pasha's forces, backed by Janissary regiments from Damascus and Anatolia, defeated the Druze decisively. The Druze and other rebellious groups in the sanjak surrendered the bulk of their firearms and made to pay tax arrears in the form of cash or land. The leader of the Ma'n, Qurqmaz, had fled and died in exile.

For a short period in 1614 and then permanently after 1660, Sidon-Beirut and its southern neighbor, Safed Sanjak, became part of the new province of Sidon Eyalet.

== Administrative divisions ==
The Sidon-Beirut Sanjak was administratively divided into the following nawahi (sing.: nahiya; subdisticts):

- Beirut
- Kisrawan
- Matn
- Gharb
- Jurd
- Iqlim al-Kharrub
- Sidon
- Shuf Ibn Ma'n
- Shuf al-Bayyada
- Shuf al-Harradin
- Iqlim al-Tuffah

== Bibliography ==
- Abu-Husayn, Abdul-Rahim (November 1992). "Problems in the Ottoman Administration in Syria during the 16th and 17th Centuries: The Case of the Sanjak of Sidon-Beirut". International Journal of Middle East Studies. 24 (4): 665–675.
- Abu Husayn, Abdul Rahim (2004). The View from Istanbul: Ottoman Lebanon and the Druze Emirate. I.B.Tauris. ISBN 9781860648564.
