= Abu al-Mawahib al-Hanbali =

Mufti and Hadith scholar (1630s–1714)

Abū al-Mawāhib al-Ḥanbalī
- Title: أبو المواهب الحنبلي

Personal life
- Born: 1634–1635 Damascus Eyalet in Syria
- Died: 1714 Damascus Eyalet
- Resting place: al-Dahdah Cemetery
- Era: Early modern period
- Region: The Levant
- Main interest: Hadith

Religious life
- Religion: Sunni Islam
- School: Hanbali
- Creed: Athari

Senior posting
- Influenced by: Numerous (see below)

Abū al-Mawāhib al-Ḥanbalī (Arabic: أبو المواهب الحنبلي) was a Hanbali Islamic scholar from Damascus who served as a mufti and a religious teacher throughout his lifetime. He was the son of Abd al-Baqi al-Hanbali, a leading Islamic scholar of the same school of thought.

== Biography ==
=== Early life ===
Born in Damascus to a scholarly Lebanese family from Baalbek, Abu al-Mawahib spent his early life in the care of his father Abd al-Baqi al-Hanbali who taught him the Qur'an and religious etiquettes. In 1645, he accompanied his father on the Hajj pilgrimage, where he met the Islamic scholars of Mecca. In his adulthood, he went to Egypt to seek knowledge and study there, but his father (who was in Damascus at the time) passed away between 1660 and 1661; after his father's death he became the sole heir of the leadership of the Hanbali community of Damascus.

=== Role as mufti ===
During his time as a mufti for the Hanbalis, he led the Rain prayer in the late 1690s. He also advised the Ottoman provincial governor of Damascus, Mehmed Pasha Kurd Bayram when the latter intended to place expensive taxes on merchants from Baalbek; the Pasha would accept the scholar's advice and quit the injustice. Aside from his career as a mufti, Abu al-Mawahib made a living out of trading and raising livestock until his death in 1714.

== Influences ==
=== Teachers ===
Abu al-Mawahib had numerous teachers throughout his academic career, amongst them;

- His father Abd al-Baqi al-Hanbali
- Khayr al-Din al-Ramli
- Ahmad al-Qushashi
- Ibrahim al-Kurani

=== Mysticism ===
Abu al-Mawahib was a supporter of Islamic mysticism and transmitted writings from the famed Sufi philosopher and mystic Ibn Arabi.
