= Hürrem Pasha =

16th century Ottoman statesman and beylerbey (governor-general) of the Damascus Eyalet

İskenderpaşazade Hürrem Pasha (died 28 August 1526), known in Arabic as Khurram ibn Iskandar Pasha, was an Ottoman statesman who served as beylerbey (governor-general) of Damascus Eyalet in 1523–1524 and afterward as beylerbey of Karaman Eyalet. He was killed in office during a battle to rout rebel tribesmen in the province. His nephew-in-law, Grand Vizier Ibrahim Pasha, erected a tomb for him the mausoleum complex of Rumi in Konya.

== Life ==
Hürrem was one of at least two sons of the veteran Ottoman statesman and commander Skender Pasha, the other being Mustafa Pasha. He was the uncle-in-law of Sultan Suleiman's grand vizier Ibrahim Pasha, who was once a slave of Iskender Pasha's family and married Hürrem's niece Muhsine Hatun.

Hürrem was appointed the beylerbey (governor-general) of Damascus Eyalet in 1523. He led a punitive expedition against the Druze of the Chouf subdistrict in Mount Lebanon led by the Ma'n family on 27 October 1523. The expedition ended with his burning of forty-three villages and the killing of at least four hundred Druze. He launched a second expedition in 1524 when his subashis (superintendents) were killed by the Druze. In the second campaign, thirty villages were burned, at least three hundred Druze were killed and three hundred Druze women and children were taken captive. His campaigns were celebrated by the Sunni Muslim scholars and poets of Damascus.

Hürrem was later appointed beylerbey of the Kayseri-based Karaman Eyalet in Anatolia. He was killed in the plain of Kayseri on 28 August 1526 attempting to suppress rebellious Turkmen tribes, who had launched a revolt in Anatolia that year. Hürrem's troops consequently fled and the rebels captured the horses, weapons and treasure of Hürrem's camp. On their way to join the kizilbash rebels in Azerbaijan, they were routed and massacred in Diyarbakir by Ottoman troops led by Hüsrev Pasha, the beylerbey of Aleppo Eyalet.

== Death and tomb ==
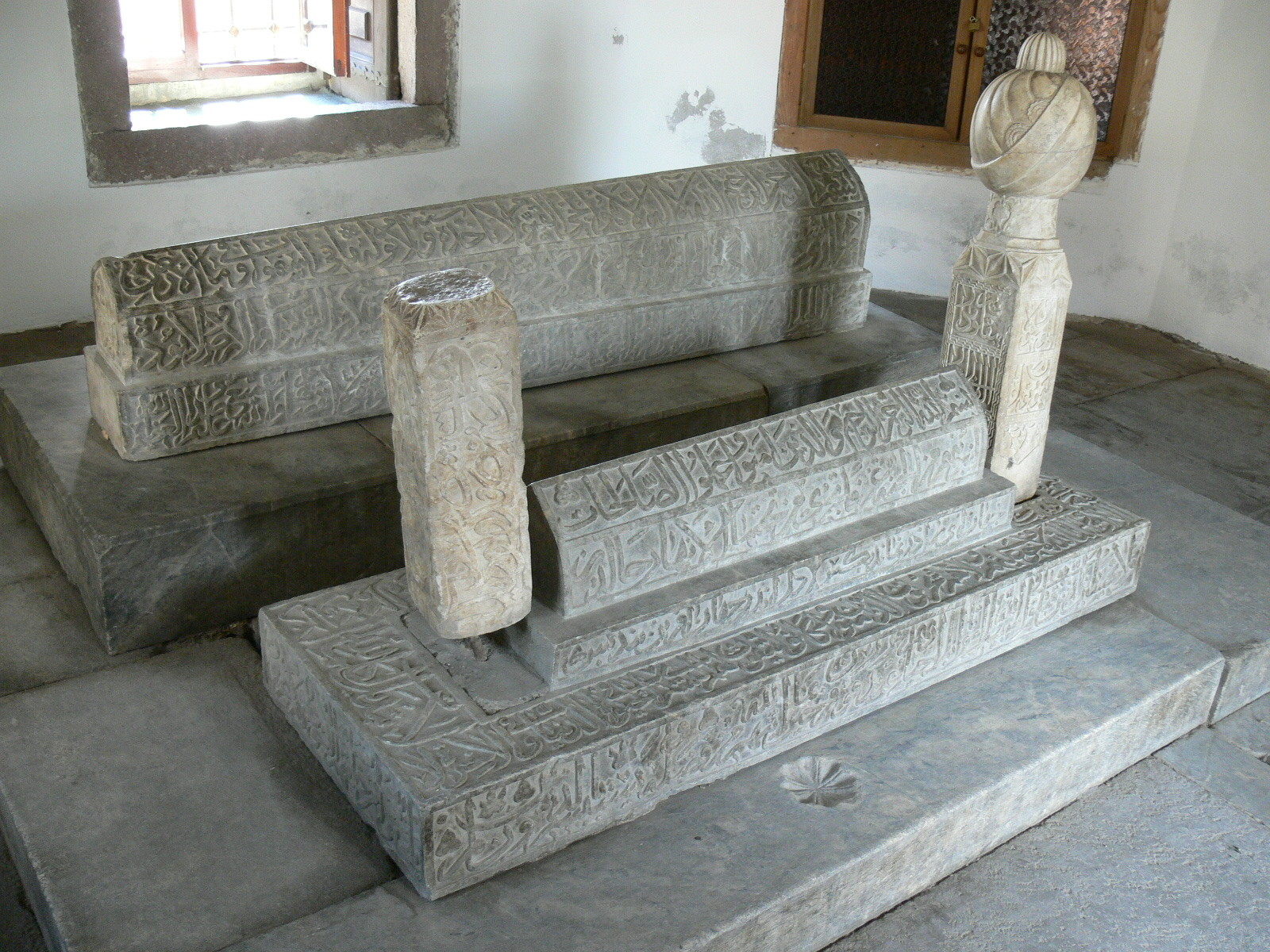
The tombstone of Hürrem Pasha and Ottoman statesman Haci Bey in the Mevlana Museum, Konya

Hürrem was buried in Konya. Ibrahim Pasha erected a mausoleum for him in the mausoleum complex of Rumi, known as the Mevlana Museum. The domed tomb, which has an octagonal plan in the classic Ottoman style, is on the east side of the kitchen. Inside the tomb is Hürrem's marble tombstone, alongside the marble tombstone of Haci Bey, an Ottoman statesman who served during Suleiman's reign.

== Bibliography ==
- Abu-Husayn, Abdul-Rahim (1985). Provincial Leaderships in Syria, 1575-1650. Beirut: American University of Beirut. ISBN 9780815660729.
- Babinger, Franz (January 1953). "Fatih Sultan Mehmed ve İtalya". Belleten. 17 (65): 41–82. Archived from the original on 2020-11-30.
- Bakirci, Naci (2007). "Konya Mawlana Deragh". İstem. 10: 191–202.
- Goodwin, Godfrey (1994). The Janissaries. London: Saqi Books. ISBN 0-86356-049-0.
- Turan, Ebru (2009). "The Marriage of Ibrahim Pasha (ca. 1495–1536): The Rise of Sultan Süleyman's favorite to the Grand Vizierate and the Politics of the Elites in the Early Sixteenth-Century Ottoman Empire". Turcica. 41: 3–36. doi:10.2143/TURC.41.0.2049287.
- Yilmaz, Mehmet Şakir (September 2006). Bureaucracy and 'Kanun' in the Reign of Suleyman the Magnificent (1520-1566) (PDF) (PhD). Ankara: Bilkent University.
