= Shams al-Din Muhammad ibn Tulun =

Damascene scholar (1475–1546)

Index page of an autograph manuscript of Ibn Ṭūlūn's al-Aḥādīth al-masmūʿa fī dūr al-qurʾān biDimashq wa-ḍawāḥīhā

Shams al-Dīn Muḥammad ibn ʿAlī ibn Aḥmad ibn Ṭūlūn al-Ṣāliḥī al-Dimashḳī al-Ḥanafī (1475 – 9 August 1546) was a Damascene scholar of ḥadīth (traditions) and fiqh (jurisprudence) of the Ḥanafī school. He is best known today for his autobiography and his historical writings, which covers the contemporary Ottoman conquest of Mamlūk Egypt.

== Life ==
Ibn Ṭūlūn was born in al-Ṣāliḥiyya, in the upper quarter near the Ḥājibiyyah School in 880 AH (1475). On his father's side, he could trace his ancestry back to a mamlūk, Khumārwayh ibn Ṭūlūn. His mother, Azdān, was from Anatolia, either a Turk or a Greek. She died of bubonic plague while he was a child.

He completed the memorization of the Qur’an at the age of seven. He attended to and studied with a group of scholars, among them: the judge Nāṣir al-Dīn ibn Zurayq, al-Sirāj ibn al-Ṣayrafī, al-Jamāl ibn al-Mubarrad, Shaykh Abū al-Fatḥ al-Mizzī, and Ibn al-Nuʿaymī, and others. He studied Fiqh under his uncle al-Jamāl ibn Ṭūlūn and others. He was highly skilled in grammar, a leading authority in jurisprudence, and well known for hadith. He was appointed to teach the Ḥanafī school at the Madrasa of Shaykh al-Islām Abū ʿUmar, and served as imam of al-Sulaymiyyah in Ṣāliḥiyyah. Students sought him out for learning grammar, people eagerly attended his lectures, and his time was fully occupied with teaching, imparting knowledge, and writing.

Ibn Ṭūlūn also studied under women scholars who had attained scholarly rank in Islamic sciences in Ṣāliḥiyya, including Umm ʿAbd al-Razzāq Khadīja bint ʿAbd al-Karīm, Umm al-Ḥasan Fāṭima bint Khalīl, and Bint al-Qāḍī Imād al-Dīn Abū Bakr.

He possessed broad mastery in most of the well-known sciences, even in dream interpretation and medicine.

A number of distinguished figures studied under him and excelled during his lifetime, such as al-Shihāb al-Ṭībī, the shaykh of preachers and hadith scholars; al-ʿAlāʾ ibn ʿImād al-Dīn; al-Najm al-Bahnasī, the preacher of Damascus; and among the last of them Shaykh Ismāʿīl al-Nābulusī, Muftī of the Shāfiʿīs; al-Zayn ibn Sulṭān, Muftī of the Ḥanafīs; al-Shihāb al-ʿAythāwī, Muftī of the Shāfiʿīs; al-Shihāb ibn Abī al-Wafāʾ, Muftī of the Ḥanbalīs; the judge Akmal ibn Mufliḥ; and others.

In 1484, Ibn Ṭūlūn received a scholarship to study fiqh at the Māridāniyya madrasa. He received an ijāza (authorization to teach) from al-Suyūṭī. He spent his life teaching and writing. In old age, he declined the positions of khaṭīb of the Umayyad Mosque and Ḥanafī muftī of Damascus because of his old age. He never married and had no children. He passed away on Sunday, the eleventh of Jumādā al-Ūlā, (9 August 1546.) at over 70 years of age, and was buried in their cemetery near his uncle, the judge Jamāl al-Dīn, on the southern slope by al-Kahf and al-Khwārazmiyyah.

== Works ==
Ibn Ṭūlūn wrote an autobiography, al-Fulk al-mashḥūn fī aḥwāl Muḥammad ibn Ṭūlūn, in which he lists all the scholars he studied with, all the books he ever read and all of his writings. He gives 750 titles to his name, although these range from short pamphlets to long multi-volume works. Less than 100 of his works are preserved. The History of the Arabic Written Tradition knows of 75, but the library of Aḥmad Taymūr in Cairo may have contained 100 uncatalogued manuscripts of Ibn Ṭūlūn. As of 2004, only 25 of his works have been printed.

One of the most prolific scholars in Islamic history, Ibn Ṭūlūn resembled his teacher al-Suyūṭī in this regard. He authored works across many disciplines, from religious sciences to medicine and astronomy, though he particularly distinguished himself in history and hadith. In al-Fulku’l-mashḥūn, he personally lists 726 books and treatises, a number later expanded by modern researchers. However, most of these works have either not survived or have reached us in unusable form.

He also composed a large body of poetry, which he collected into three separate diwans. Among his extant works, those concerning the history of Damascus are of particular importance for Islamic history and civilization, containing extensive information on madrasas, mosques, khānqāhs, zawiyas, and the educational practices of his time.

Among his poetry is:

Have mercy on your lover, O gazelle,

that mercy may come from God Most High.

The tale of my tears from your coldness

is like a hadith with a continuous chain to the first.

And among it as well:

Turn away from the world and its pleasures,

for indeed it is not praiseworthy.

Follow the truth as it should be followed,

for breaths are numbered.

The finest food comes from the bee,

and the noblest garment from the worm.

== Bibliography ==
- Brinner, William M. (1971). "Ibn Ṭūlūn". In Lewis, B.; Ménage, V. L.; Pellat, Ch. & Schacht, J. (eds.). The Encyclopaedia of Islam, Second Edition. Volume III: H–Iram. Leiden: E. J. Brill. pp. 957–958. OCLC 495469525.
- Conermann, Stephan (2004). "Ibn Ṭūlūn (d. 955/1548): Life and Works". Mamlūk Studies Review. 8 (1): 115–139.
- Laoust, Henri (1952). Les gouverneurs de Damas sous les Mamelouks et les premiers Ottomans (1156–1741): Traduction des annales d'Ibn Tulun ('Histoires des Gouverneurs Turcs de Damas') et d'Ibn Gum'a ('Histoires des Pachas et des Cadis de Damas'). Institut français d'études arabes de Damas.
- Miura, Toru (2016). Dynamism in the Urban Society of Damascus: The Ṣāliḥiyya Quarter from the Twelfth to the Twentieth Centuries. Brill. doi:10.1163/9789004304437.
- Wollina, Torsten. "Tracing Ibn Ṭūlūn's Autograph Corpus, with Emphasis on the 19th–20th Centuries". Journal of Islamic Manuscripts. 9 (2–3): 308–340. doi:10.1163/1878464X-00902012.
- Ibn al-ʿImād al-Ḥanbalī. Shadharāt al-Dhahab fī Akhbār man Dhahab. Damascus: Dār Ibn Kathīr, 1982, vol. 10, p. 428. https://archive.org/details/07_20230830/10/page/n427/mode/2up
