= Damascus Eyalet =

Administrative division of the Ottoman Empire from 1516 to 1865

Damascus Eyalet Arabic: إيالة الشام Ottoman Turkish: ایالت شام
- Eyalet of the Ottoman Empire
- 1516–1865
- Flag

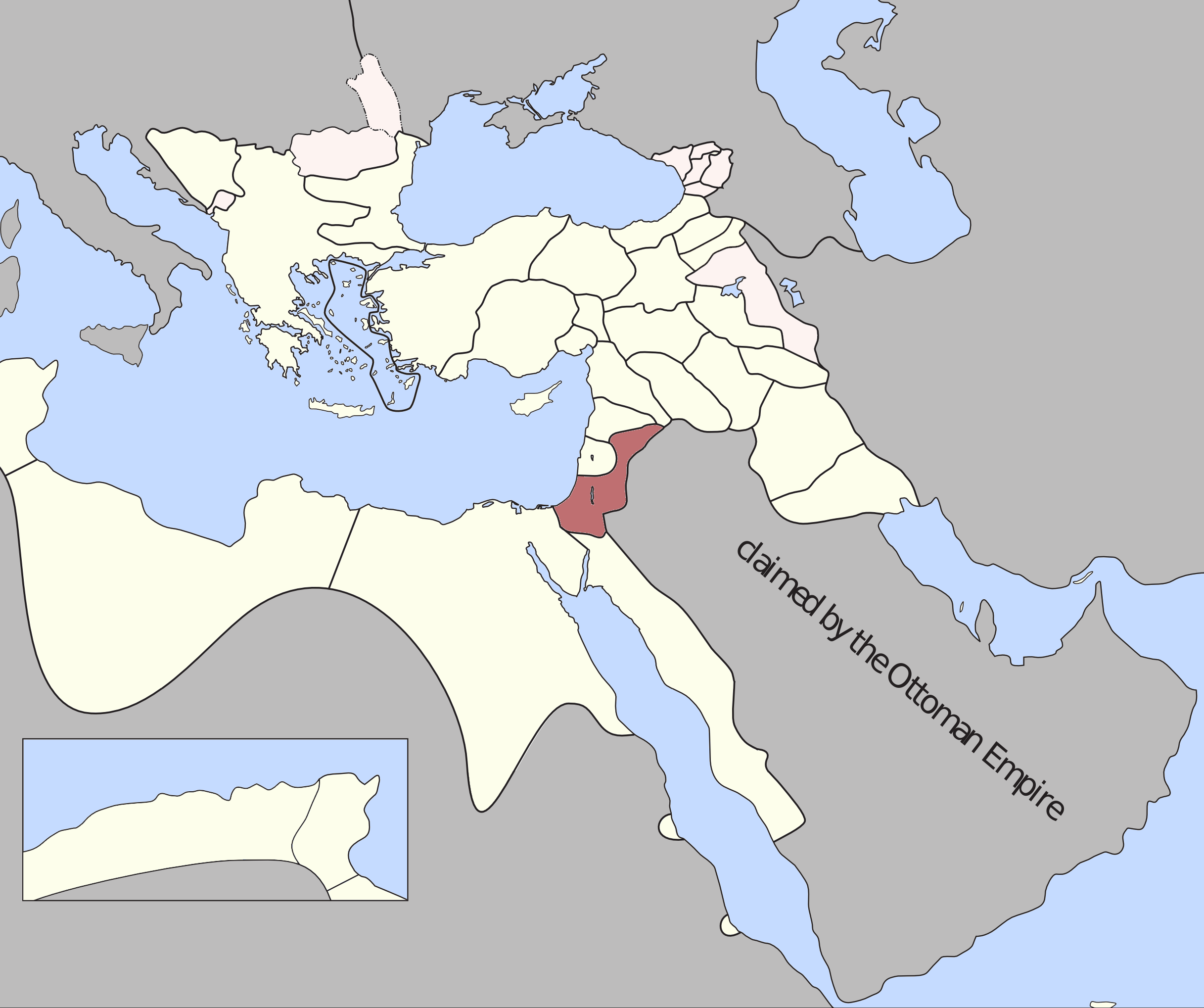
- The Damascus Eyalet in 1795
- Capital: Damascus
- History
  - Battle of Marj Dabiq: 1516
  - Disestablished: 1865
Preceded by	Succeeded by
Mamluk Sultanate	Syria Vilayet; Mutasarrifate of Jerusalem
- Today part of: Palestine; Israel; Jordan; Syria

Damascus Eyalet (Arabic: إيالة دمشق; Ottoman Turkish: ایالت شام, romanized: Eyālet-i Šām) was an eyalet of the Ottoman Empire. Its reported area in the 19th century was 51,900 square kilometres (20,020 sq mi). It became an eyalet after the Ottomans took it from the Mamluks following the 1516–1517 Ottoman–Mamluk War. Janbirdi al-Ghazali, a Mamluk traitor, was made the first beylerbey of Damascus. The Damascus Eyalet was one of the first Ottoman provinces to become a vilayet after an administrative reform in 1865, and by 1867 it had been reformed into the Syria Vilayet.

== Territorial jurisdiction ==
The Ottoman Empire conquered Syria from the Mamluks following the Battle of Marj Dabiq in August 1516 and the subsequent pledges of allegiance paid to the Ottoman sultan, Selim I, in Damascus by delegations of notables from throughout Syria. The Ottomans established Damascus as the center of an eyalet (Ottoman province) whose territories consisted of the mamlakat (Mamluk provinces) of Damascus, Hama, Tripoli, Safad and Karak. The mamlaka of Aleppo, which covered much of northern Syria, became the Aleppo Eyalet. For a few months in 1521, Tripoli and its district were separated from Damascus Eyalet, but after 1579, the Tripoli Eyalet permanently became its own province.

At the close of the 16th century, the Damascus Eyalet was administratively divided into the sanjaks (districts) of Tadmur, Safad, Lajjun, Ajlun, Nablus, Jerusalem, Gaza and Karak, in addition to the city of Damascus and its district. There was also the sanjak of Sidon-Beirut, though throughout the late 16th century, it frequently switched hands between the eyalets of Damascus and Tripoli. Briefly in 1614, and then permanently after 1660, the Sidon-Beirut and Safad sanjaks were separated from Damascus to form the Sidon Eyalet. These administrative divisions largely held place with relatively minor changes until the mid-19th century.

== Administrative divisions ==
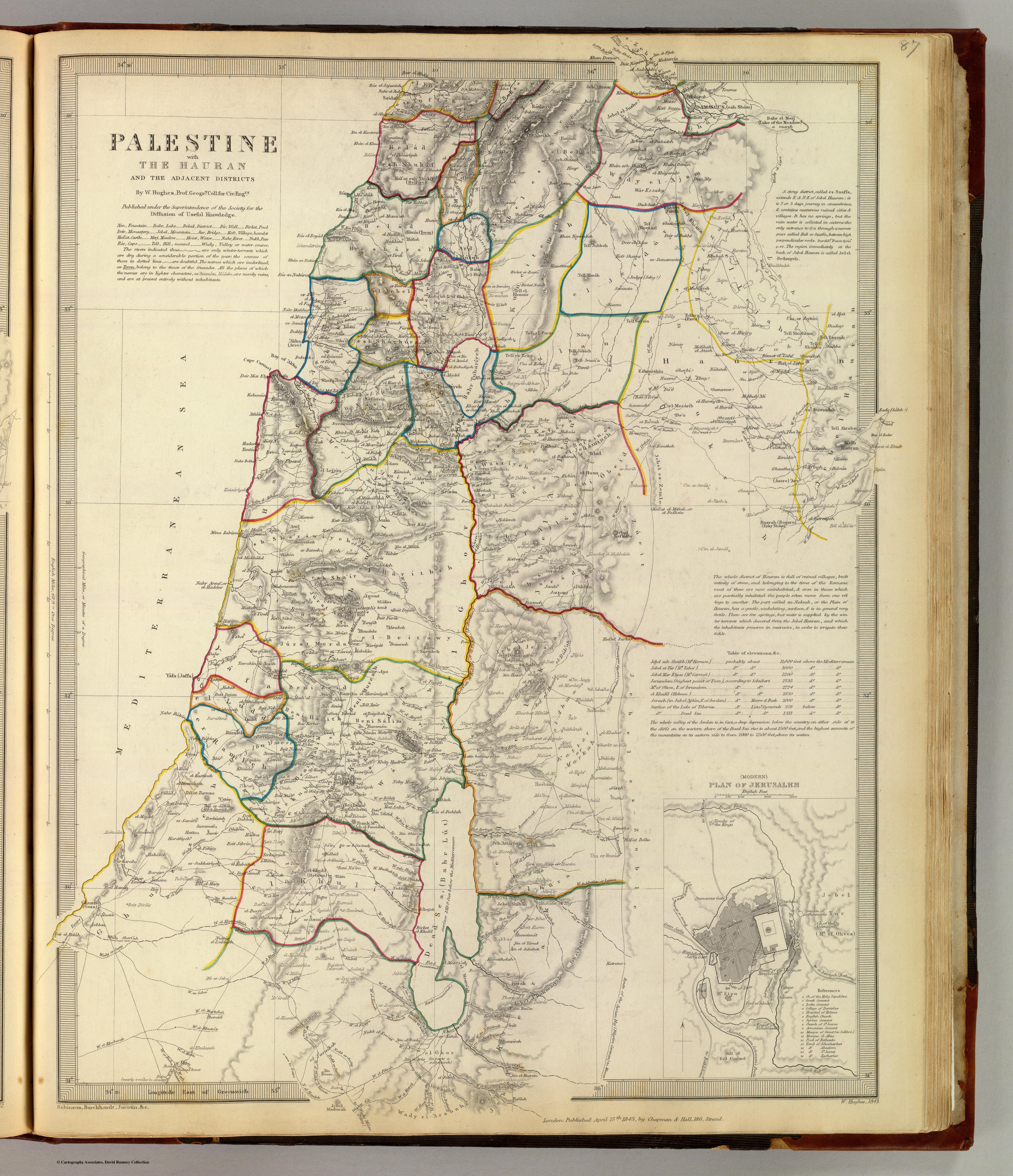
Palestine with the Hauran and the adjacent districts, William Hughes 1843

Sanjaks of Damascus Eyalet in the 17th century:

- Khass sanjaks (i.e. yielded a land revenue):
1. Sanjak of Damascus
2. Sanjak of Jerusalem
3. Sanjak of Gaza
4. Sanjak of Karak
5. Sanjak of Safad
6. Sanjak of Nablus
7. Sanjak of Ajlun
8. Sanjak of Lajjun
9. Sanjak of Beqaa
- Salyane sanjaks (i.e. had an annual allowance from government):
1. Sanjak of Tadmur
2. Sanjak of Sidon
3. Sanjak of Beirut

Sanjaks between 1700 and 1740

1. Sanjak of Damascus
2. Sanjak of the Mîr-Haclık (managed the muslim pilgrimage)
3. Sanjak of Karak
4. Sanjak of Jerusalem
5. Sanjak of Gaza
6. Sanjak of Lajjun
7. Sanjak of Baalbek

== See also ==
- Ottoman Syria
- Abu al-Mawahib al-Hanbali

== Bibliography ==
- Abu-Husayn, Abdul-Rahim (2004). The View from Istanbul: Ottoman Lebanon and the Druze Emirate. I.B.Tauris. ISBN 9781860648564.
- Bakhit, Muhammad Adnan (1982). The Ottoman Province of Damascus in the Sixteenth Century. Librairie du Liban. ISBN 9780866853224.
- Salibi, Kamal S. (1988). A House of Many Mansions: The History of Lebanon Reconsidered. University of California Press. ISBN 9780520071964.
- Ze'evi, Dror (1996). An Ottoman Century: The District of Jerusalem in the 1600s. Albany: State University of New York Press. ISBN 0-7914-2915-6.
