= Abdulrahim Abu-Husayn =

Palestinian author (1951 - 2022)

Abdulrahim Abu-Husayn (1 March 1951 – 23 June 2022) was a Palestinian author, professor at the American University of Beirut (AUB)'s Department of History and Archaeology, and an honorary member of the Turkish Historical Society. He is a recognized authority on the history of Ottoman Syria, with emphasis on the areas later constituting modern Lebanon.

== Life ==
Abu-Husayn was born in 1951 in the Palestinian village of Nuba in the Hebron area, then immigrated to Jordan with his family. He ranked in the top 10 in the Tawjihi exams, scoring a 902 out of a possible 1000, which earned him a scholarship at AUB through USAID. In 1971, he began his undergraduate degree in English and planned to return to Jordan to continue teaching. Abu-Husayn had come from poverty and hardships, which made him determined to excel in his studies. When he completed his undergraduate studies in 1975, at the beginning of the Lebanese Civil War, he instead remained at AUB and continued his master's degree in anthropology, followed by the PhD program which he completed in 1982.

Abu-Husayn was mentored by the AUB's Kamal Salibi, a noted historian of Lebanon. Through the use of Ottoman imperial archives and other original sources from the Ottoman period, Abu-Husayn expanded on Salibi's work in this field, and successfully challenged many of the myths of Lebanese history during the Ottoman era.

== Works ==
- Abu-Husayn, Abdul-Rahim (1985). Provincial Leaderships in Syria, 1575–1650. Beirut: American University of Beirut. ISBN 9780815660729.
- Abu-Husayn, Abdul-Rahim (1985). "The Ottoman Invasion of the Shūf in 1585: A Reconsideration". Al-Abhath. 32: 13–21.
- Abu-Husayn, Abdul-Rahim (November 1992). "Problems in the Ottoman Administration in Syria during the 16th and 17th Centuries: The Case of the Sanjak of Sidon-Beirut". International Journal of Middle East Studies. 24 (4): 665–675. doi:10.1017/S002074380002239X. JSTOR 164441. S2CID 159670509.
- Abu-Husayn, Abdul-Rahim (1993). "Khalidi on Fakhr al-Din: Apology as History". Al-Abhath. 41: 3–15.
- Abu-Husayn, Abdul-Rahim (1998). "The Shihab Succession (1697): A Reconsideration". Archiv Orientální. 8: 9–16. ISSN 0044-8699.
- Abu-Husayn, Abdul-Rahim (1999). "The Junblats and the Janbulads: A Case of Mistaken Identity". In Köhbach, Markus; Procházka-Eisl, Gisela; Römer, Claudia (eds.). Acta Viennensia Ottomanica: Proceedings of the 13th CIEPO-Symposiums, from 21 to 25 September 1998. Vienna: Selbrstverlag des Instituts für Orientalistik. pp. 1–6. ISBN 9783900345051.
- Abu-Husayn, Abdul-Rahim (new ed.) (2025). "The Junblats and the Canbolads: A Case of Mistaken Identity". In Winter, Stefan; HajHasan, Zainab (eds.). Syrian-Kurdish Intersections in the Ottoman Period. Toronto: University of Toronto Press. pp. 128–136. ISBN 978-1-4875-5440-8.
- Abu-Husayn, A. R. (1999). "The Unknown Career of Ahmad Ma'n (1667-1697)". Archivum Ottomanicum. 17: 241–247.
- Abu-Husayn, Abdul-Rahim (2004). The View from Istanbul: Ottoman Lebanon and the Druze Emirate. I.B.Tauris. ISBN 9781860648564.
