= Georges Dib Nehme =

Lebanese politician (1932–2019)

- Born: Georges Youssef Dib Nehmé; 28 November 1932; Deir al-Qamar, Lebanon
- Died: 2 September 2019 (aged 86)
- Burial place: Deir al-Qamar
- Education: St. Joseph University
- Occupation: Lawyer

Georges Dib Nehme (Arabic: جورج ديب نعمة; 28 November 1932 – 2 September 2019) was a Lebanese businessman and politician who served as the president of the municipality council of Deir al-Qamar and as a member of the Lebanese Parliament.

== Early life and education ==
Dib Nehme was born in Deir al-Qamar on 28 November 1932. He received a degree in law from the St. Joseph University.

== Career ==
Following his graduation Dib Nehme was involved in business. He was elected as the president of the municipality council of Deir al-Qamar in 1963. In addition, he became a member of the Parliament in 1992 and served there until 2005. His term as president of the municipality council of Deir al-Qamar continued until 1998. After the end of the Civil War Dib Nehme actively worked for the return of the Christian Lebanese to the region who had to leave their homes.

== Death ==
Dib Nehme died on 2 September 2019. He was buried in Deir al-Qamar.
