= Church of Saidet et Tallé =

Maronite Church in Lebanon

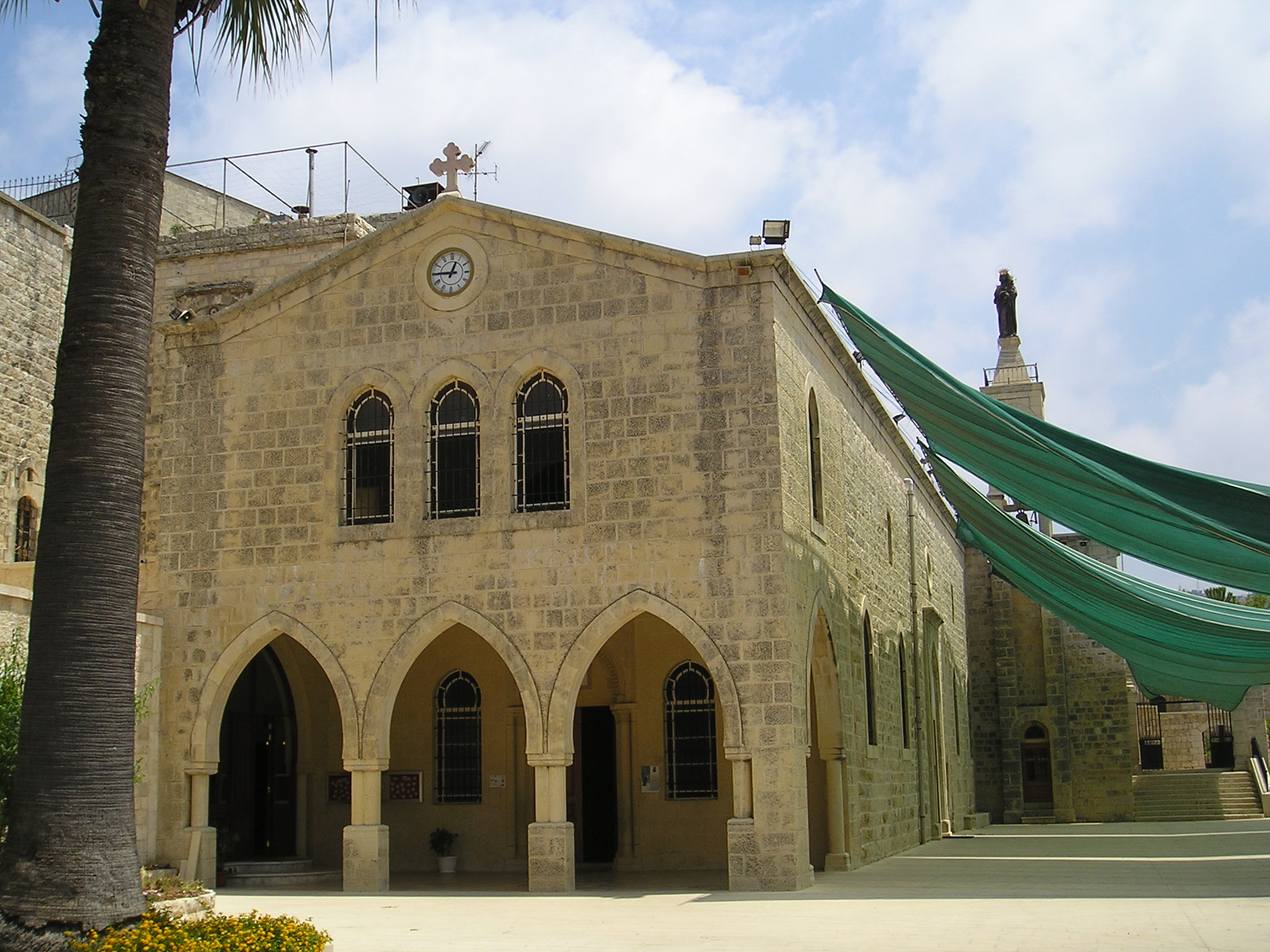
Saidet et Talle

The Church of Saidet et Tallé, sometimes spelled Saydet El Talle and translated as Our Lady of the Hill, is a Maronite church in Deir el Qamar in Lebanon. It is one of the most important historical and religious sites in Deir el Qamar and dates to the 16th century.

Monk Nicolas Smisaati built a church on the site over the ruins of an old Phoenician temple dedicated to the goddess Astarte. It was destroyed by an earthquake in 859 and reconstructed by the Order of the Templars during the Crusades.

The second church was destroyed and then rebuilt during Fakhreddine 1st Maan's (1518-1544) reign. In 1673, Sheikh Abu Fares Karam of Ehden (Emir Ahmed Maan’s secretary) and his brother Sheikh Abu Nader enlarged the church and added a vault. During the reign of Bechir II Chehab (1789-1840) it was again enlarged and renovated.

== Legend and legacy ==
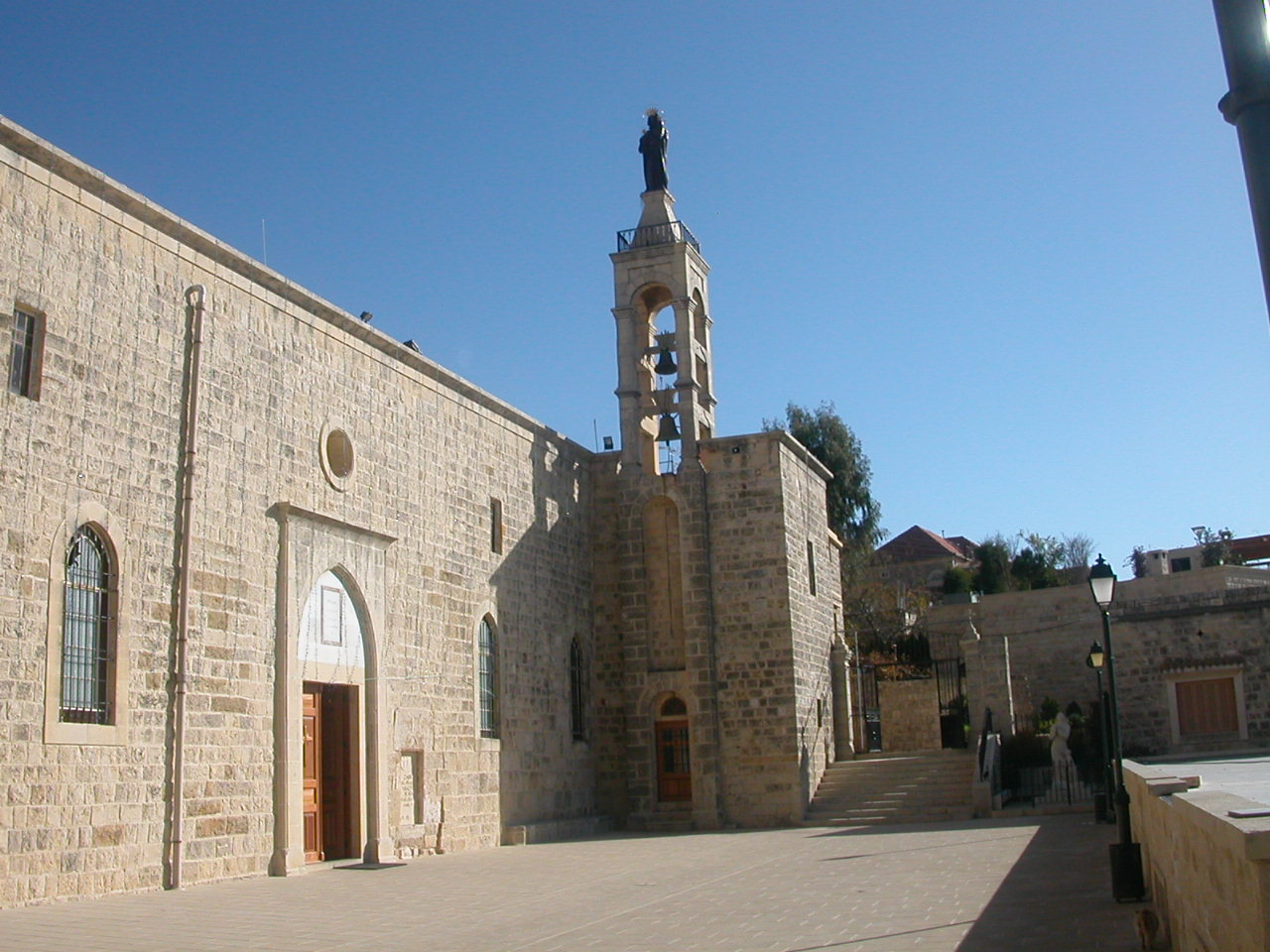
Church of Saidet et Tallé, also known as the "Church of the Virgin of the Druze".

According to the Maronite Heritage web site, "the legend says that there was a Druze Emir in Baakline looking at the hill of Dar El Kamar. He saw a light coming out of the hill so he gathered his soldiers and ordered them to go in the morning and dig in the land. He said to them: 'If you find an Islamic symbol, build a mosque. If you find a Christian symbol, build a church."

In the morning, the soldiers went and found a rock with a cross on it and under the cross there was the moon and venus. That was the sign that in the distant past there was a temple dedicated to the moon and venus and later it became a church.

Earthquakes and wars might be the reason for the holy site's disappearance. The rock discovered by the soldiers can be found above the old gate of the church. A Byzantine column can be found inside the church. The inhabitants honor a "miraculous" icon of our Lady of the Hill placed behind the altar. It was painted in 1867 by the Italian artist Achille Guerra. On the feast of Our Lady of the Hill- the first Sunday of August - thousands of believers go in a big procession with the miraculous icon from the entrance of Deir El Qamar to the Church.

For centuries, the church has been revered by both Druze and Christians in Mount Lebanon, reflecting the close ties between the two communities. According to Pierre-Marie Martin, writing in 1870, the Druze venerated the church even more than the Maronites, often traveling long distances to pray to the Virgin Mary in their own way and witnessing numerous miracles. Historian Glenn Bowman further highlights that in the early nineteenth century, Druze leaders would seek the Virgin Mary's favor at Saidet et Tallé before going into battle. They would touch the image of the Virgin Mary with their flags and place dust from under the altar in their turbans. The profound veneration of this church by the Druze led local Maronites to dub it the "Church of the Virgin of the Druze".

== See also ==
- Architecture of Lebanon
