= Deir al-Qamar =

Deir el Qamar دير القمر
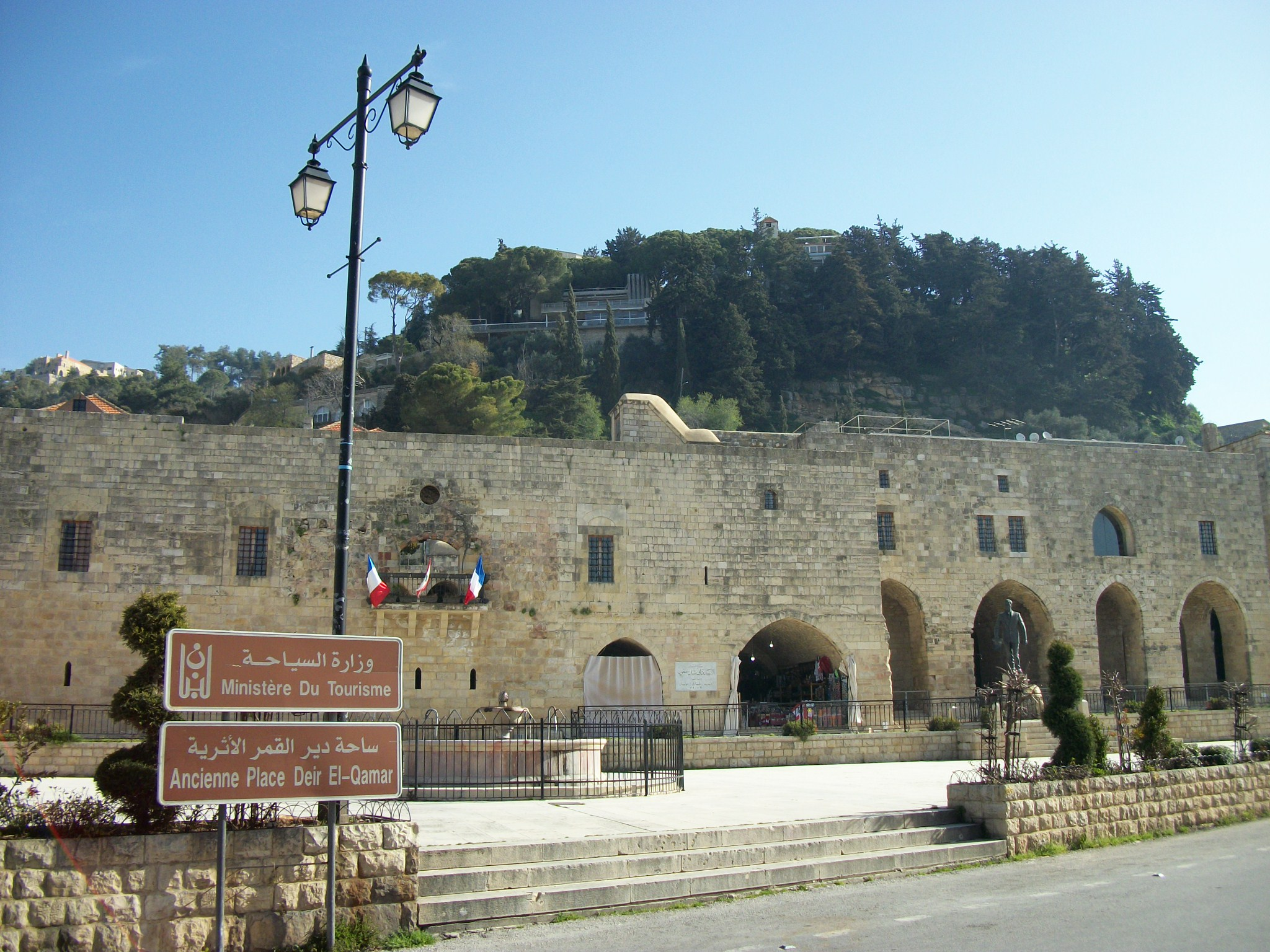
- Deir al-Qamar main square

- Location within Lebanon
- Coordinates: 33°42′N 35°34′E
- Country: Lebanon
- Governorate: Mount Lebanon Governorate
- District: Chouf District
- Time zone: UTC+2 (EET)
  - Summer (DST): UTC+3 (EEST)
- Dialing code: +961

Deir al-Qamar (Arabic: دَيْر الْقَمَر, romanized: Dayr al-qamar, lit. 'Monastery of the moon') is a city south-east of Beirut in south-central Lebanon. It is located five kilometres outside of Beit ed-Dine in the Chouf District of the Mount Lebanon Governorate at 800 m of average altitude.

== History ==
Palace of Gergis Baz overlooking the midan square

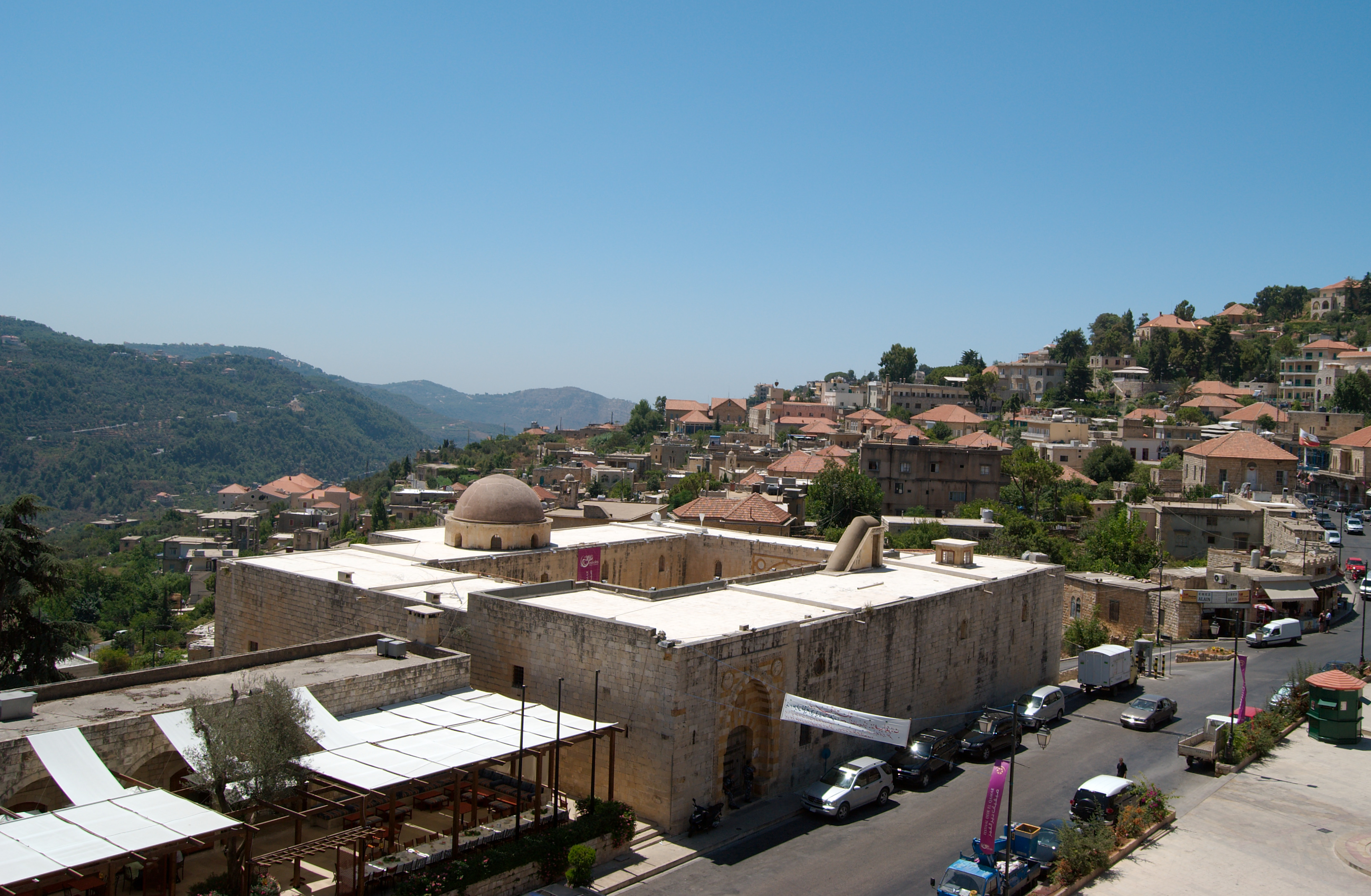
Panoramic view of Deir al-Qamar. In the foreground the Municipal Council.

=== Crusader period ===
The oldest written reference to Deir el Qamar (Deir elcamar or Deir elchamar) goes back to 1257 and 1261 in the deeds of Julian of Shouf and Andrew of Chouf selling their lands and villages in their lordship of Chouf to the Teutonic Order as reported in Tabulae Ordinis Theutonici.

=== Ottoman period ===
During the 16th to 18th centuries, Deir al-Qamar was the capital and the residence of the Emirate of Mount Lebanon. It is also notable for its 15th-century Fakhreddine Mosque, Fakhreddine II Palace, and the palace of the Emir Yusuf Shihab - today housing the Municipal Council. A 17th-century synagogue is still standing in the village, although closed to the public. During its peak, the city was the centre of Lebanese literary tradition. Deir al-Qamar also served as an important commercial and artisanal centre for the villages of the Shuf, with textile production, metalworking and soap manufacturing as some of its industries.

European travellers in the early nineteenth century often described Mount Lebanon through orientalist and exoticizing imagery, reflecting contemporary European attitudes toward the region. Lady Hester Stanhope visiting Deir al-Qamar in 1812 wrote “I have traveled for nine hours together & never found a place to pitch a tent, except near one Village. The Vineyards are like stair cases, & every little flat place stuffed with mulberry trees for the silkworms, the roads are horrible, & the people savage & extraordinary, the women wearing a great tin trumpet on their heads & a veil suspended upon it, & seemingly very proud of these frightful horns.”

It was the first village in Lebanon to have a municipality in 1864, and it is the birthplace of many well known personalities, such as artists, writers, and politicians.

Following the conflict of the 1840s, Mount Lebanon was divided into separate Christian and Druze administrative districts. Deir al-Qamar became the winter capital of the southern Druze district, while Baakleen served as its summer capital.

People from all religious backgrounds lived there and the town had a mosque, synagogue and Christian churches.

Before the political transformations of the nineteenth century, Deir al-Qamar was under the authority of the Druze Abu Nakad shaykhs. Thus, rather than along religious lines, political authority in Mount Lebanon was organized mainly around notable families and their territorial districts.

In the year 1841, Deir al-Qamar became a major site of conflict between Druze notables and Maronites inhabiting the town. The conflict developed and disputes arose over land, taxation and the restoration of the authority of Druze notable families following the end of Egyptian rule. Maronite villagers entered disputes about some of the returning notables's property claims and claimed rights of protection and equality granted by the Gülhane proclamation and British promises.

In the year 1860, Deir al-Qamar was destroyed during the civil war between Druze and Christians during which the town was set ablaze. Napoleon III sent a French contingent to rebuild it, recalling France ancient role as protector of the Christians in the Ottoman Empire as established by a treaty in 1523.

In 1864, Deir el-Qamar elected the first municipality in the Arab provinces of the Ottoman Empire.

A census undertaken in Deir al-Qamar by the Ottomans during the reign of Fakhr-al-Din II's father, Qorqmaz bin-Maan, counted 156 men, all Druze. Today, 85% of Deir al-Qamar's inhabitants are Maronites and 14% are Melkites.

== General aspect ==
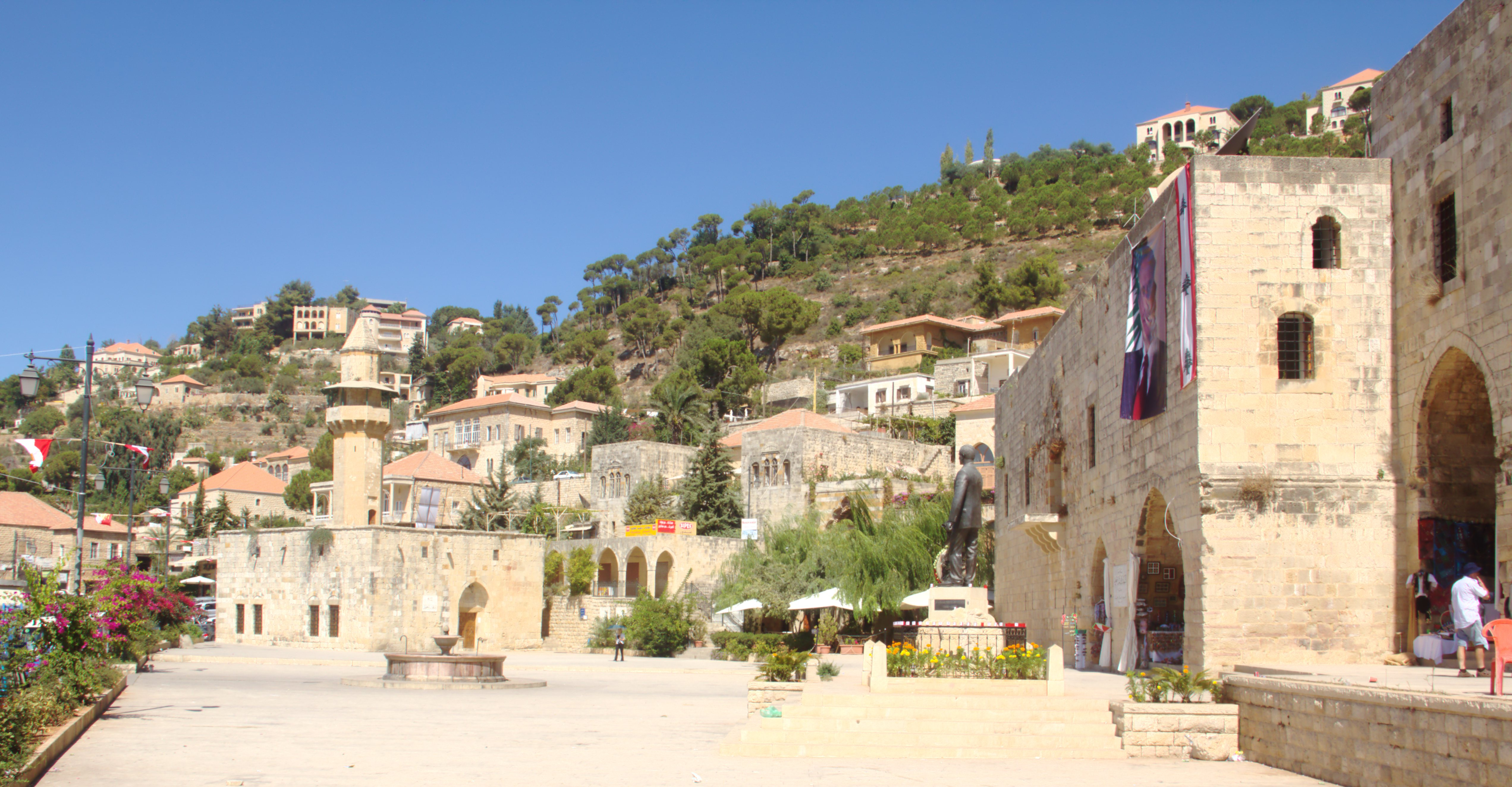
The square

The village retains a remarkable picturesque appearance with typical stone houses with red tile roofs. In 1945 it was placed under monument protection.

In 1943 the Lebanese president Bechara Al Khoury declared Deir al-Qamar the summer palace for the Lebanese Presidents.

One of the mayors was Georges Dib Nehme who also represented the region at the Parliament.

== Demographics ==
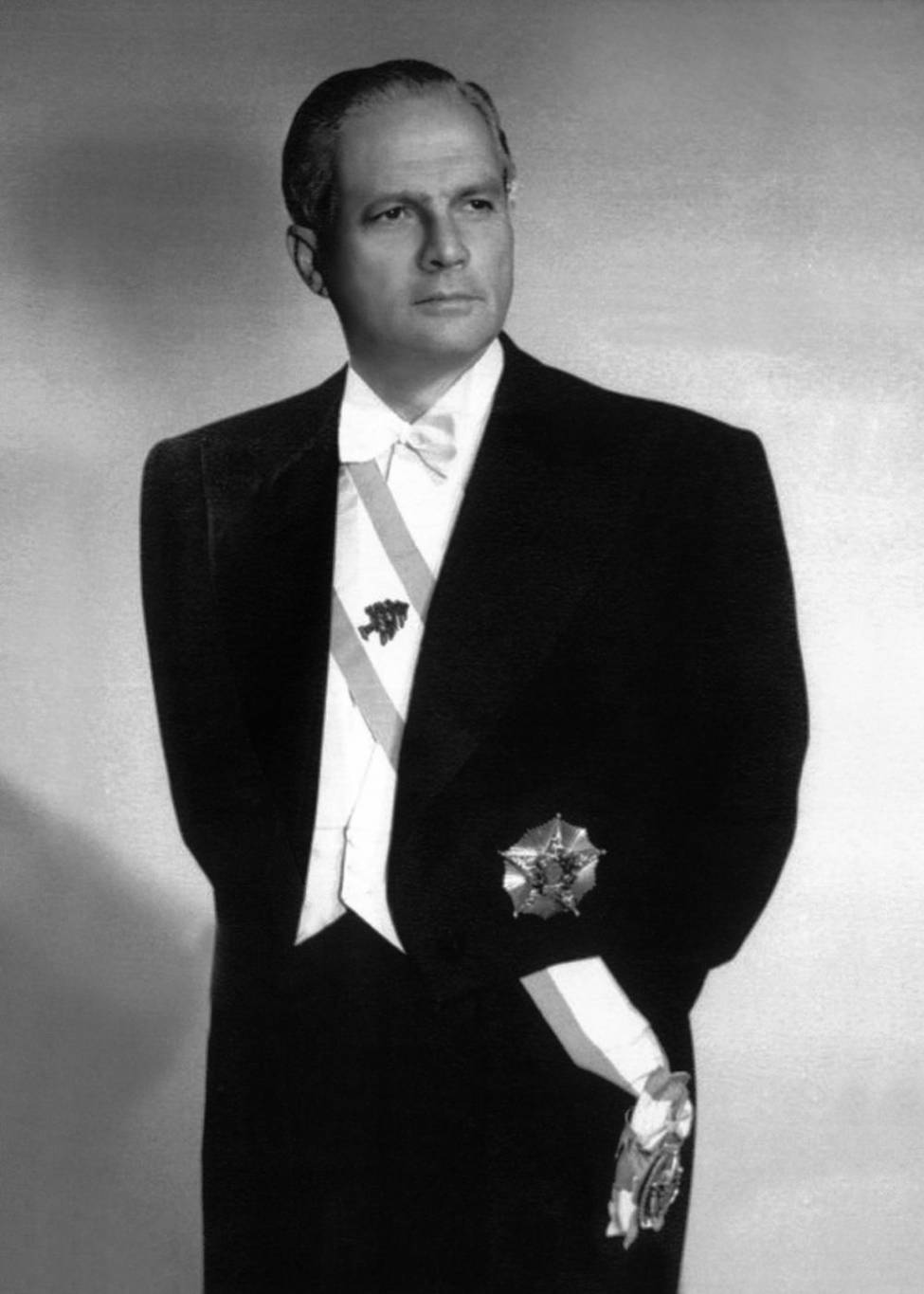
Maronite Catholic president Camille Chamoun was born in Deir al-Qamar.

In 2014, Christians made up 98.05% of registered voters in Deir al-Qamar. 73.39% of the voters were Maronite Catholics and 15.80% were Greek Catholics.

== Religious sites ==
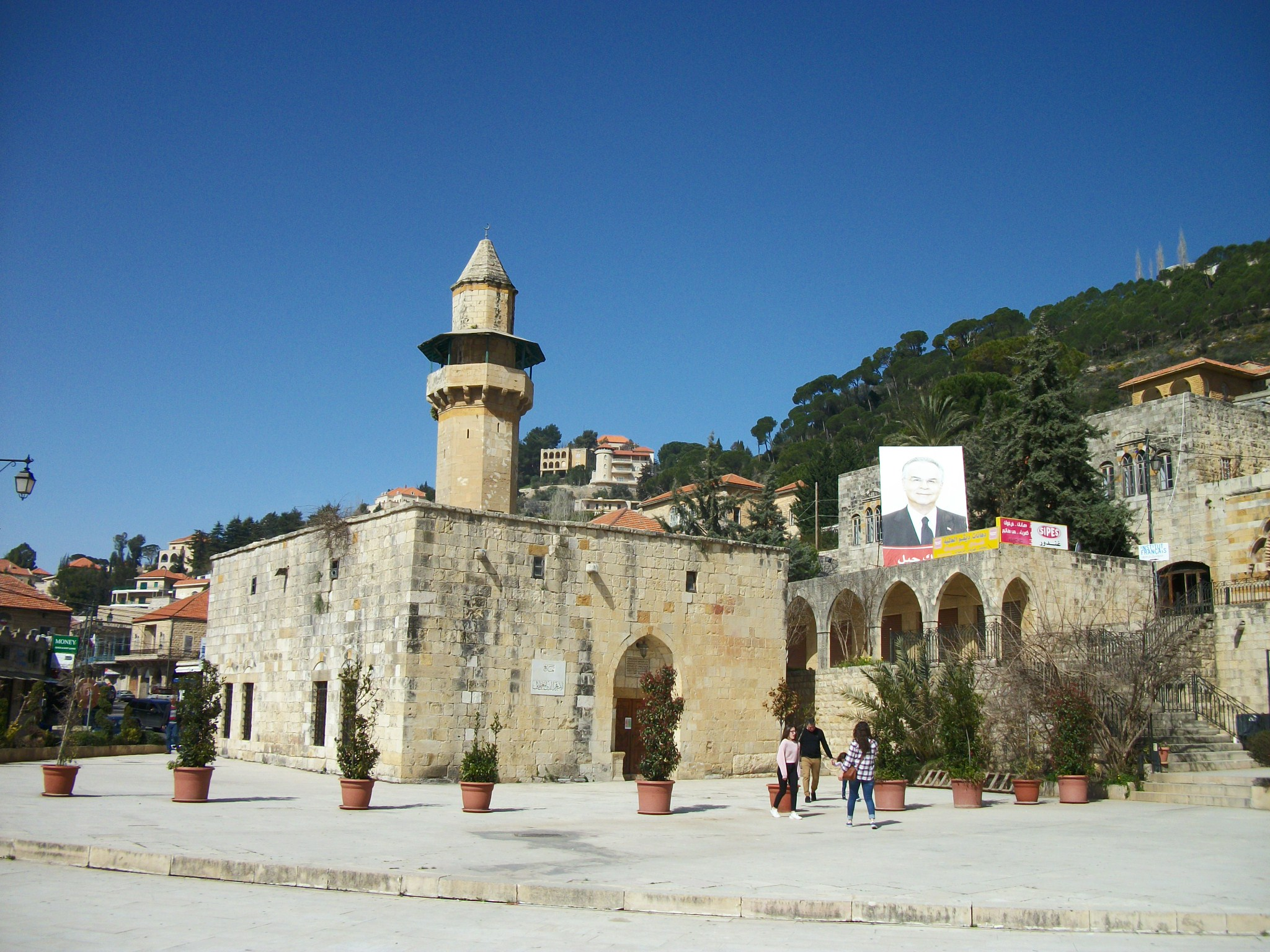
Fakhreddine Mosque, built by Fakhr-ad-Din in 1493 and restored in the 16th century by the namesake emir, it is the oldest mosque in Mount Lebanon.

One of the important mosques in Deir al-Qamar is Fakhreddine Mosque and its goes back to 15th century. Built in 1493 by the Ma'nid emir Fakhr al-Din I and restored in the sixteenth century, it is the oldest mosque in Mount Lebanon.

One of the most important historical and religious site in Deir al-Qamar is Our Lady of the Hill known as Saydet El Talle. This Maronite church goes back to the 15th century.

According to the Maronite Heritage web site

the legend says that there was a Druze Emir in Baakline looking at the hill of Deir al-Qamar. He saw a light coming out of the hill. He gathered his soldiers and ordered them to go in the morning and dig in the land. He said to them: "If you find an Islamic symbol, build a mosque. If you find a Christian symbol, build a church." The soldiers went in the morning, dug in the land and found a rock with a cross on it and under the cross there was the Moon and Venus. That was the sign that long time ago, there was a temple dedicated to the Moon and Venus and later it became a church. Earthquakes and wars might be the reason for its disappearance.

The rock discovered by the soldiers can be found above the old gate of the church. A Byzantine column can be found inside the church. The inhabitants honor a miraculous icon of our Lady of the Hill placed behind the altar. It was painted in 1867 by the Italian artist Guerra. On the feast of Our Lady of the Hill—the first Sunday of August—thousands of believers go in a big procession with the miraculous icon from the entrance of Deir al-Qamar to the Church.

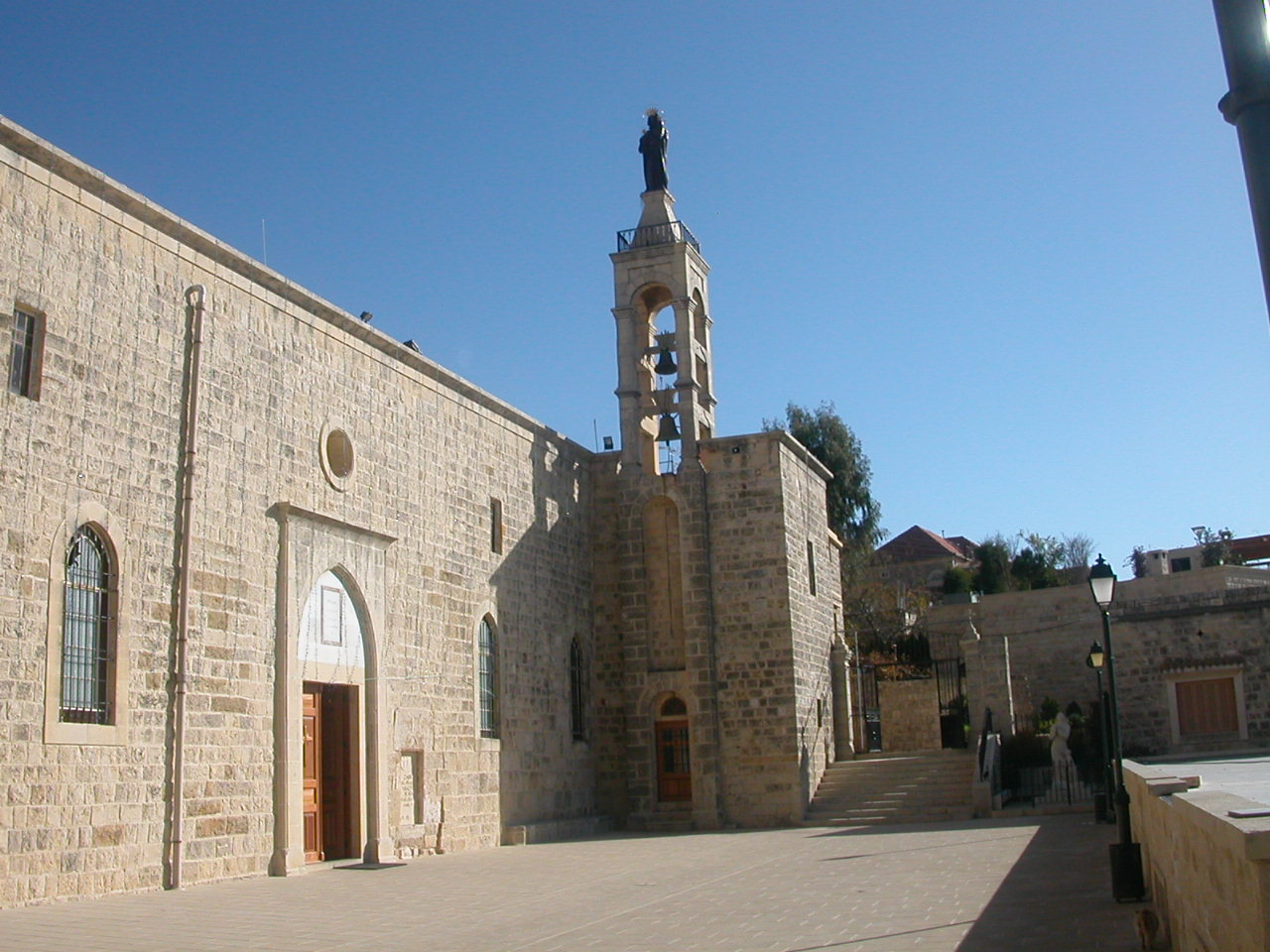
Church of Saidet et Tallé, also known as the "Church of the Virgin of the Druze".

The Church of Saidet et Tallé in Deir el Qamar is one of the most significant historical and religious sites in Mount Lebanon. The original church was destroyed by the Saracens and later rebuilt during the reign of Fakhreddine I Maan (1518–1544). For centuries, this church has been revered by both Druze and Christians in Mount Lebanon, reflecting the close ties between the two communities. According to Pierre-Marie Martin, writing in 1870, the Druze venerated the church even more than the Maronites, often traveling long distances to pray to the Virgin Mary in their own way and "witnessing numerous miracles". Historian Glenn Bowman further highlights that in the early nineteenth century, Druze leaders would seek the Virgin Mary's favor at Saidet et Tallé before going into battle. They would touch the image of the Virgin Mary with their flags and place dust from under the altar in their turbans. The profound veneration of this church by the Druze led local Maronites to dub it the "Church of the Virgin of the Druze".

Another important religious site in Deir al-Qamar is the Mount of the Cross where pilgrims visit the Lamb of God Shrine (built in 2007), Father Yacoub Church (restored and consecrated as a church on June 24, 2008) and the Cross (built by Fr. Yacoub in 1932).

Deir al-Qamar also had a well-established Jewish community, and a synagogue (built in 1638) which is today the site of the French Cultural Center.

== Jewish community ==
The first record of a Jewish community in Deir al-Qamar in modern times is found in the writings of Rabbi Joseph Soffer, who visited Lebanon in 1759. Invited to the town to write a Torah scroll, he experienced an earthquake but successfully completed his work. He also reported visiting the nearby tomb of Noah and his son Shem. The village is referenced in the Responsa literature, particularly in the "Khut haMeshulash." All in all, these sources suggest that under the rule of Yusuf Shihab and Zahir al-Umar, a Jewish community existed, complete with its own beth din and synagogue. Records indicate that there was a demand for additional Torah scrolls, which wealthy Jews in the community were capable of funding.

Rabbi Joseph Schwartz provides additional insights into the Jewish community of Deir al-Qamar, estimating it consisted of around 80 householders, primarily engaged in trade. He reports that the Jews of Deir al-Qamar leased nearby mountains from the Emirs for iron production, exporting iron horseshoes throughout the country. The Jews of Deir al-Qamar are also known to be landowners of vineyards and olive plantations, participating in agriculture. A letter dated 1865 reveals that, following the hardships of 1859–1860, which compelled their departure from the village, the Jewish residents sold off all their fields and plantations to their Christian neighbors.

After the 1837 Safed earthquake, the Jewish sages of Safed sought assistance from the Jews of Deir al-Qamar. Thirty-five armed Jews responded, arriving in Safed to aid in clearing the debris, retrieving the deceased for burial, and potentially providing material assistance to those impacted by the disaster. In 1847, the Jews of Deir al-Qamar fell victim to a blood libel. Nine locals were falsely accused of murdering a Maronite child who had become lost and died of exposure, freezing to death in one of the vineyards. With the assistance of the British consul, they were ultimately released from custody.

The 1860 civil conflict in Mount Lebanon marked the demise of the Jewish community in Deir al-Qamar. Alongside the Druze, the local Jews were compelled to depart, selling their homes and lands to the Christians. Initially, the synagogue remained under Jewish ownership, with the Jews blocking it with stones to prevent its desecration. The synagogue was eventually sold in 1893, against the advice of the sages of Jerusalem, who instructed that it should not be sold unless for the construction of a new synagogue.

== Wax museum ==
The Marie Baz Wax Museum was created by Mr. Samir Emile Baz in the family palace. It tells the story of Lebanon from the 15th century to the present day through its main characters.

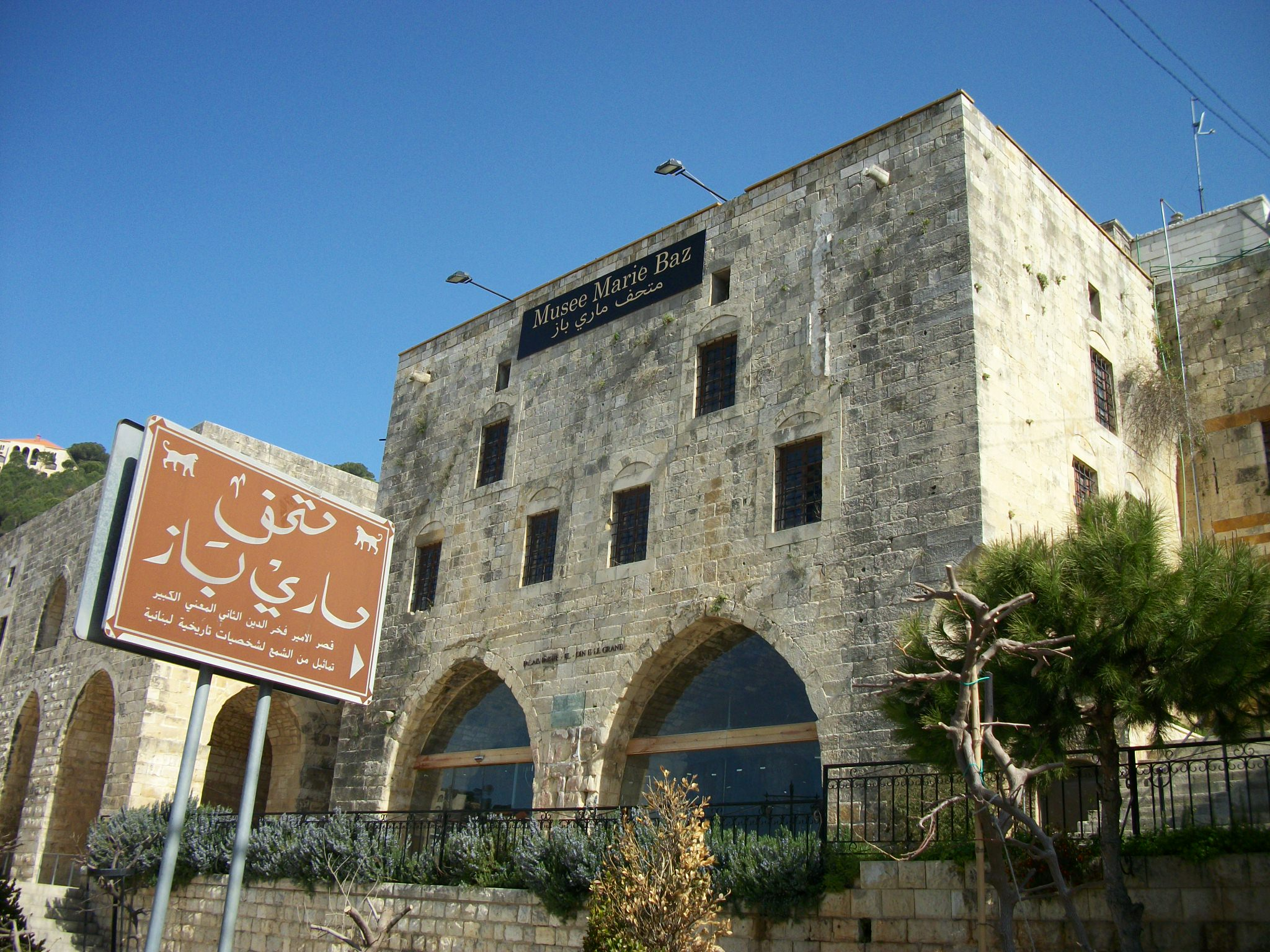
Marie Baz Wax Museum

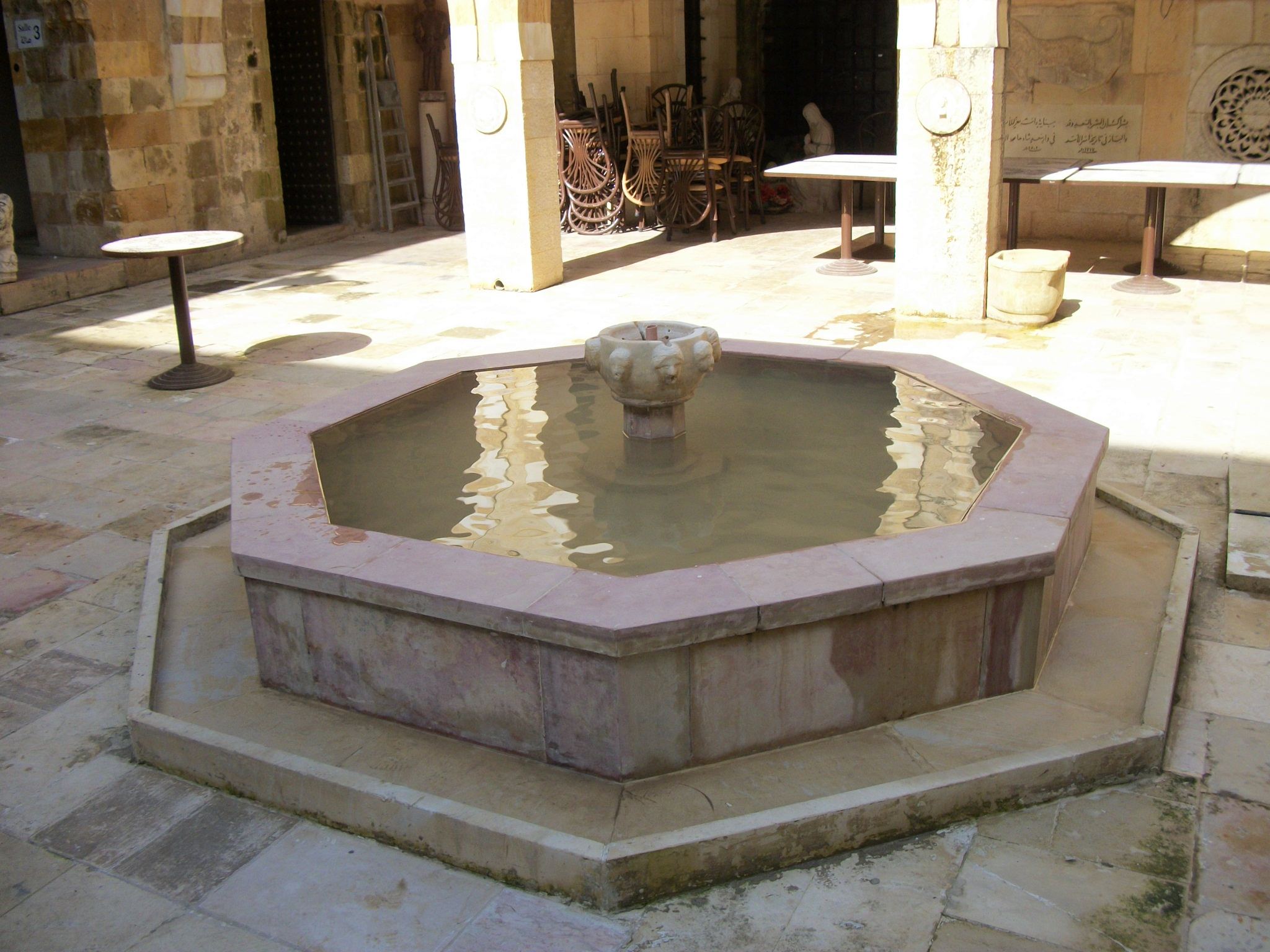
Fountain inside the Marie Baz Wax Museum

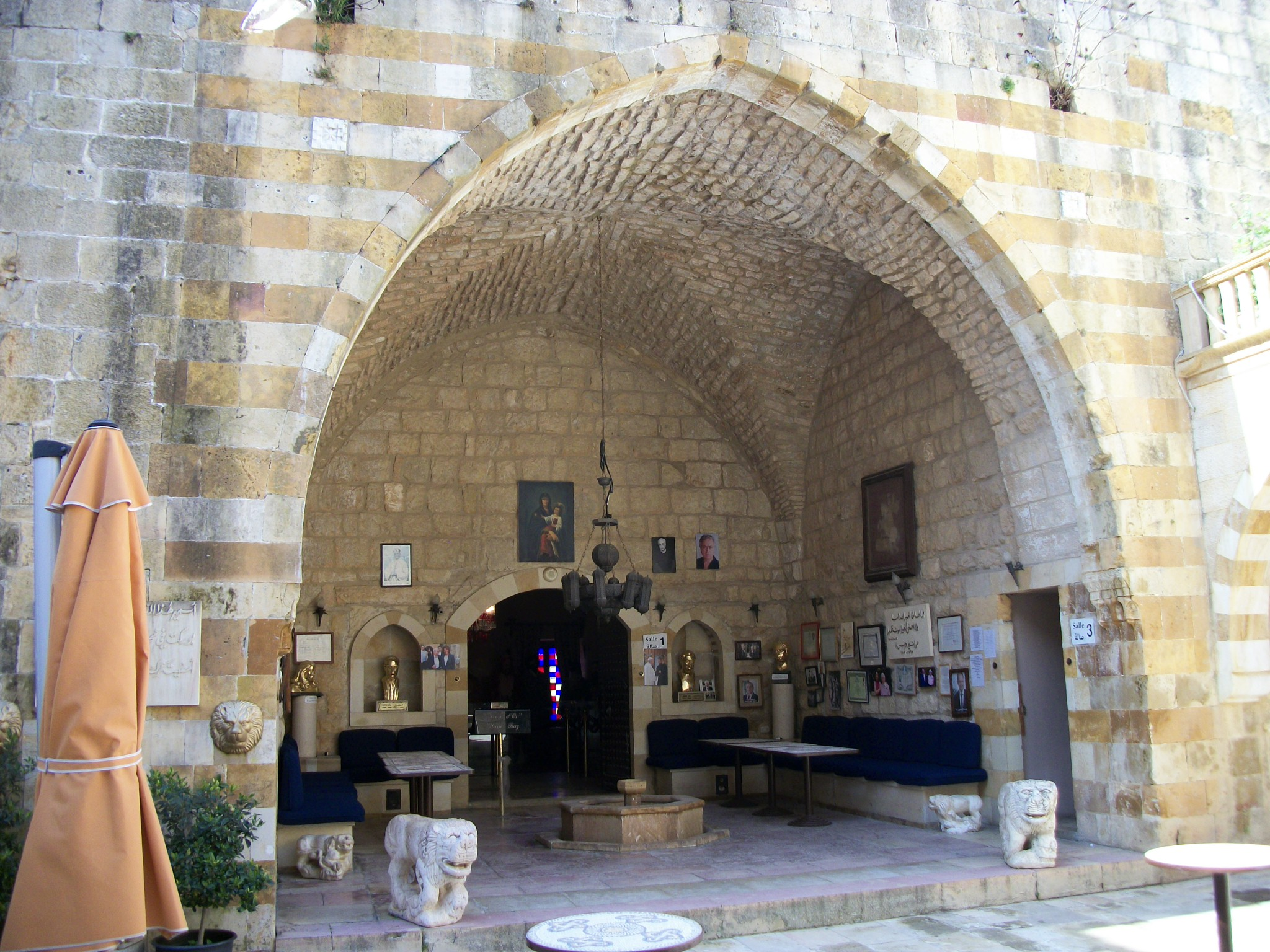
Room dedicated to the history of the Baz family and one of the entries

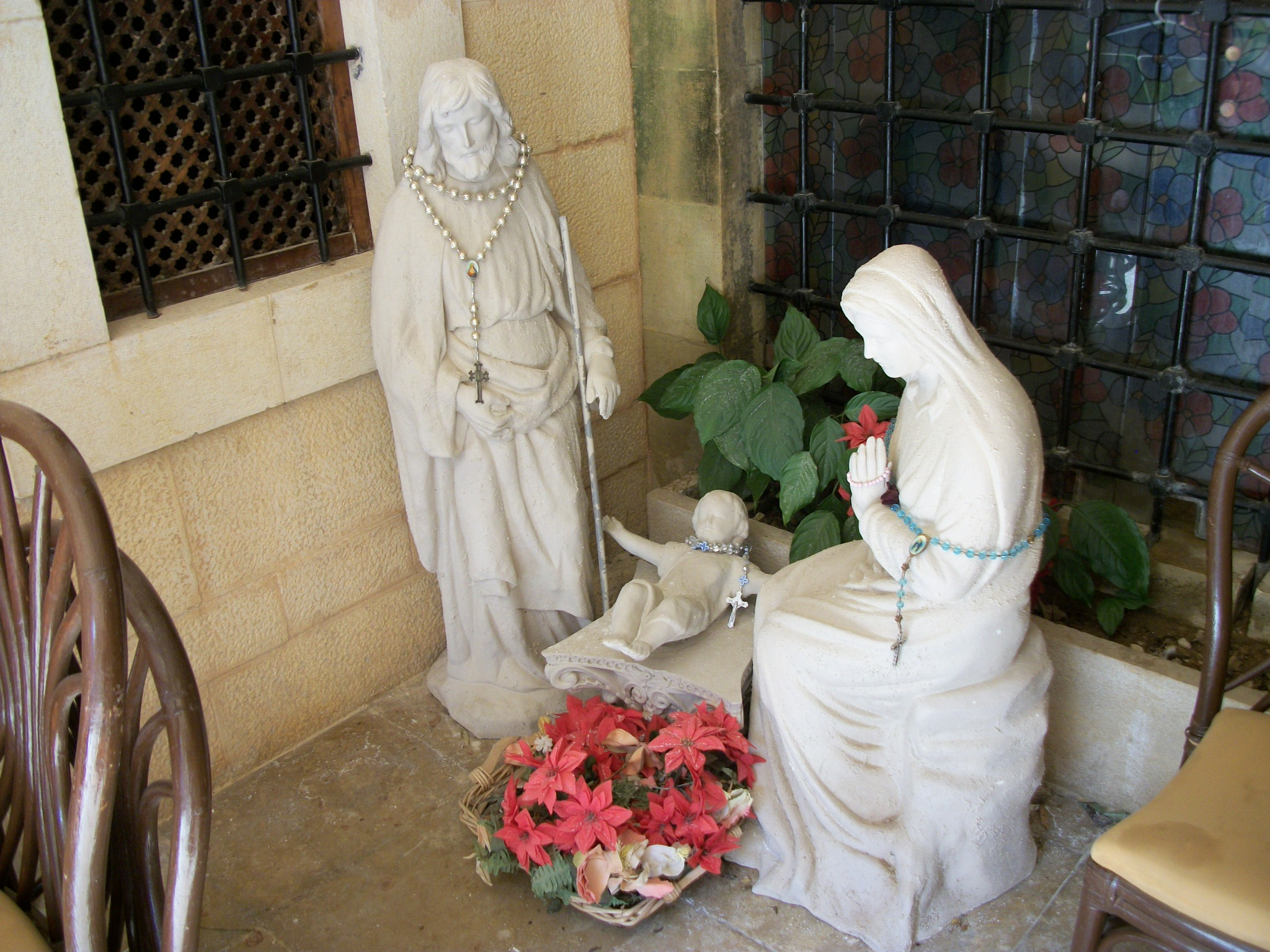
Statue of the Holy Family-baby Jesus, mother Mary and Saint Joseph

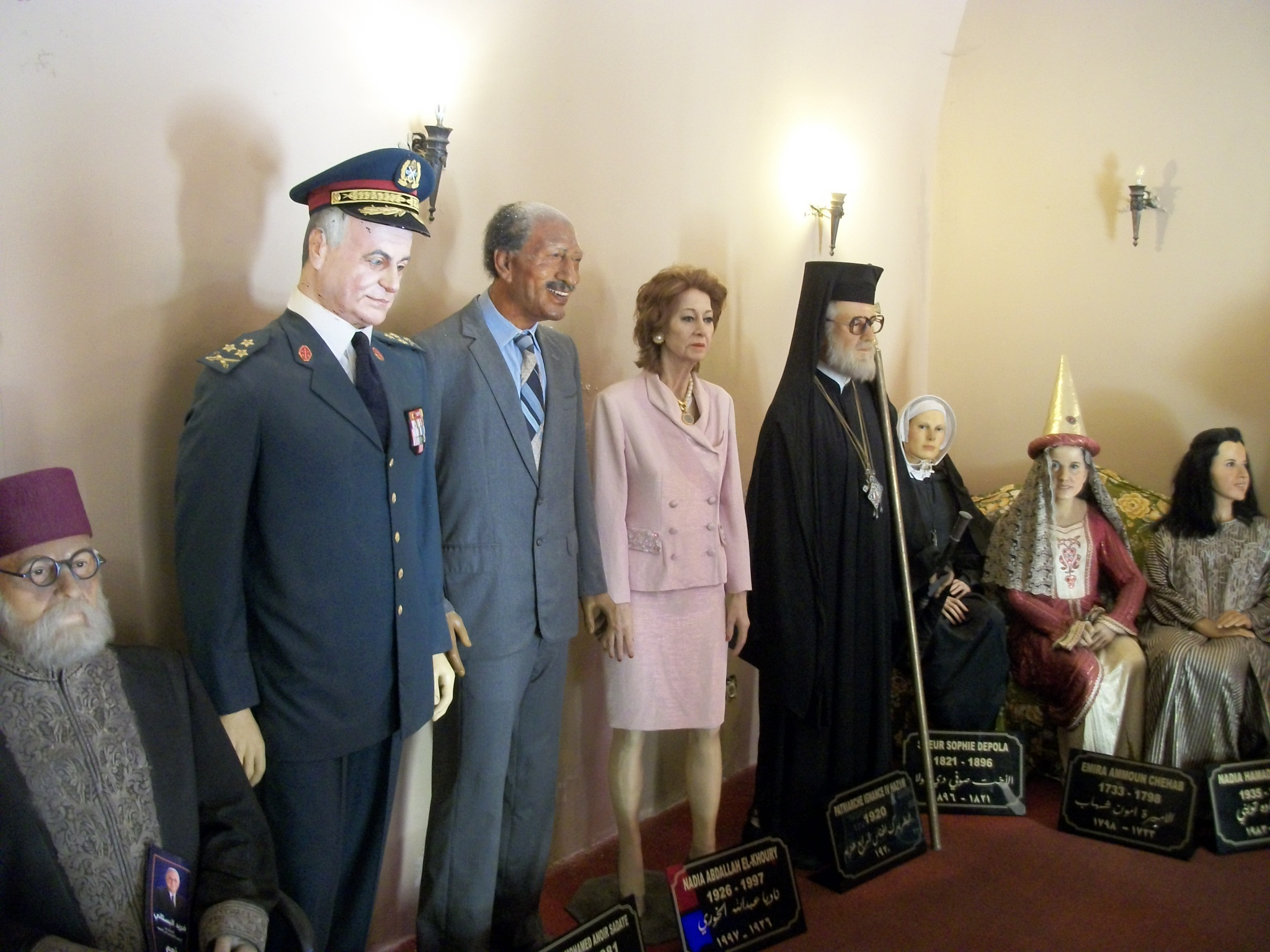
Wax figures

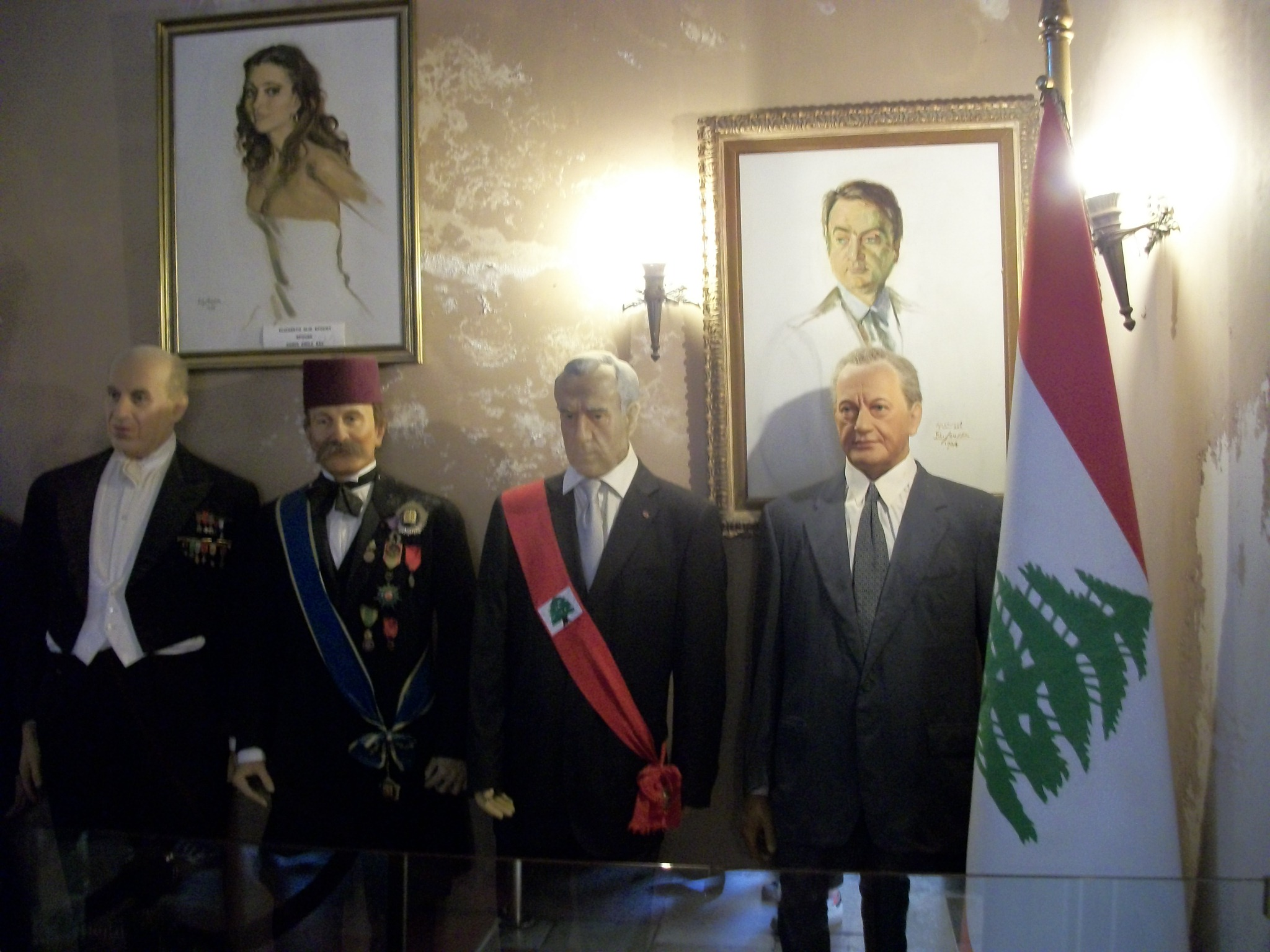
Wax figures

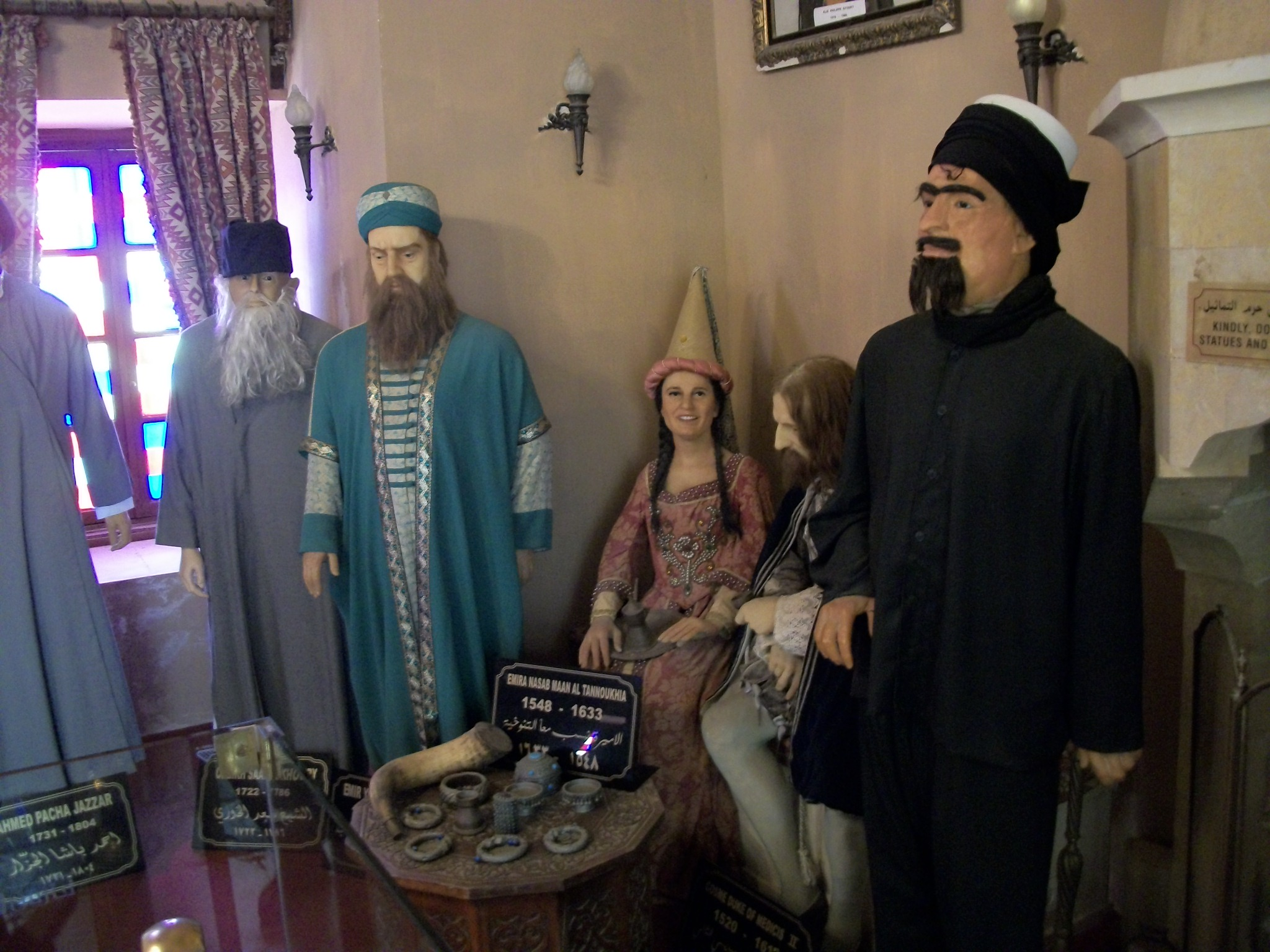
Wax figures

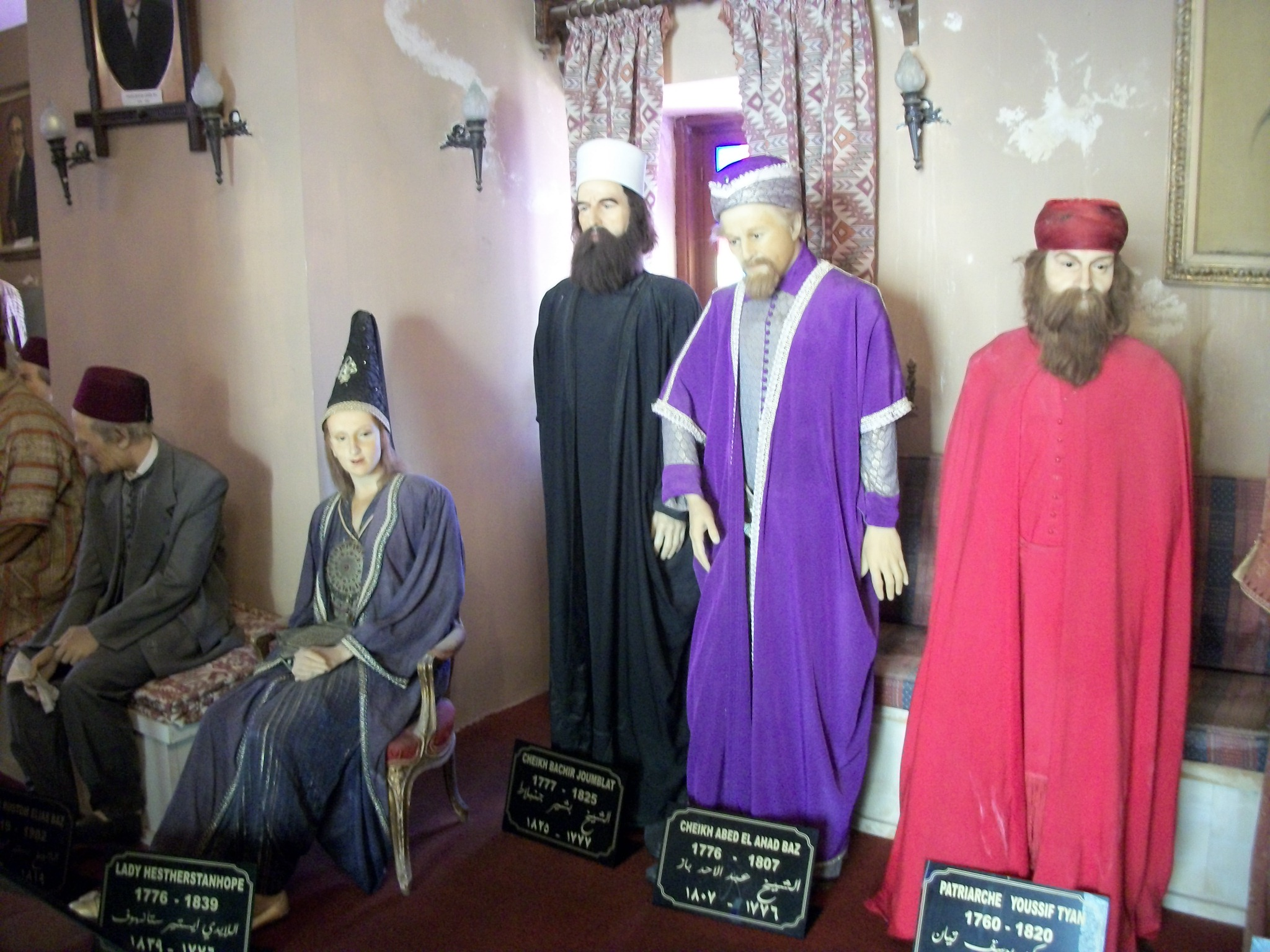
Wax figures

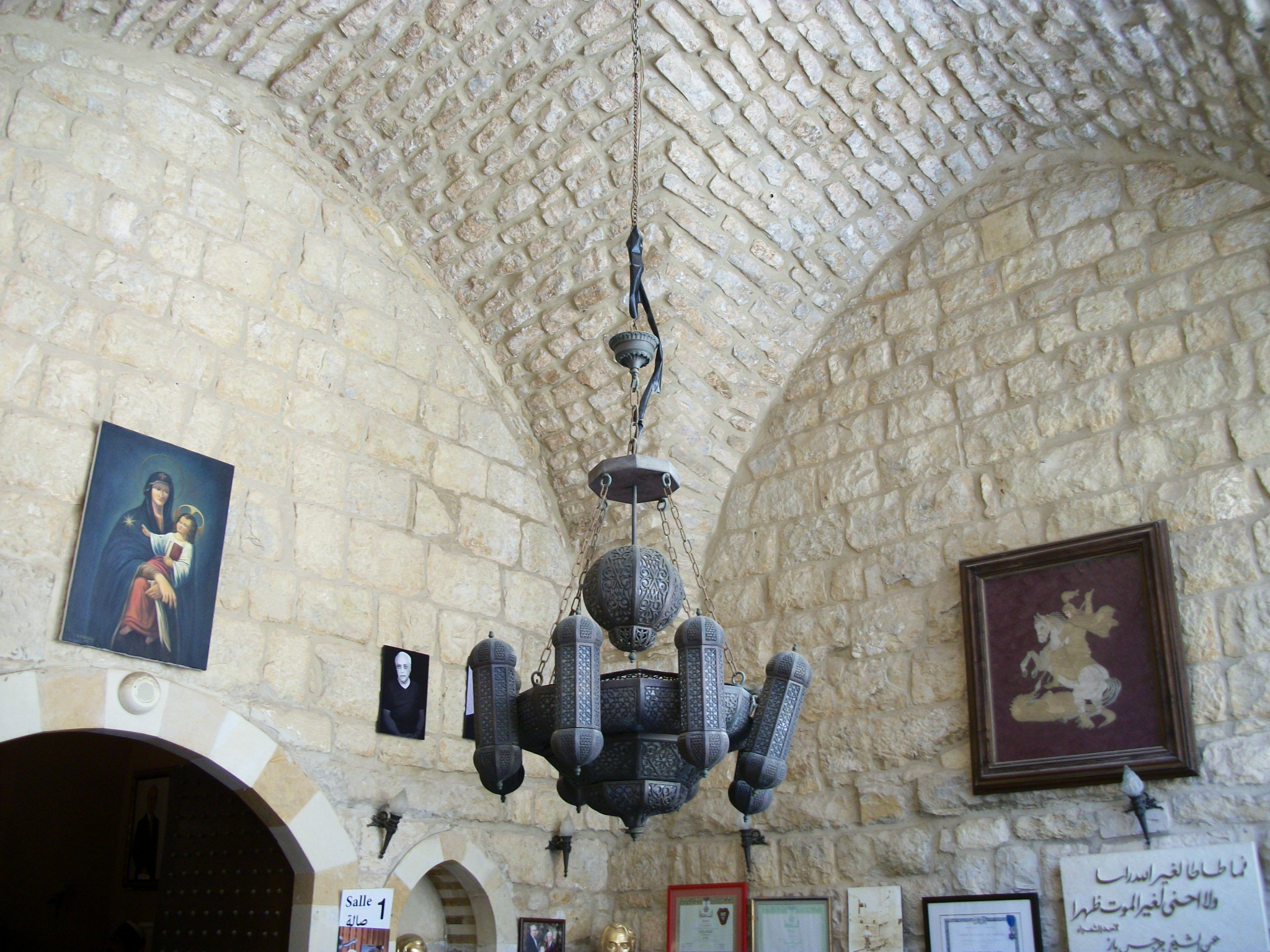
Baz family history room

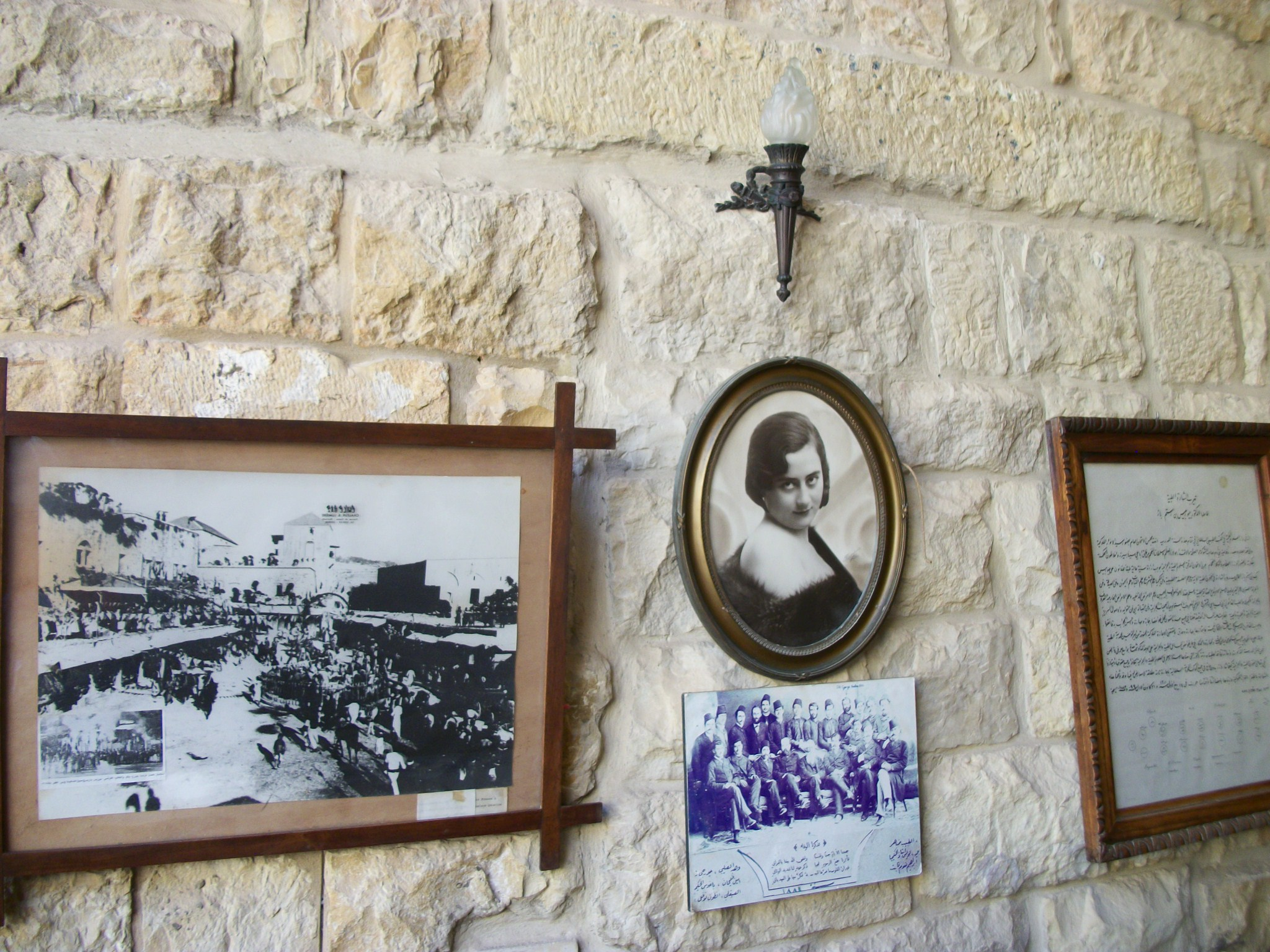
Baz family history room

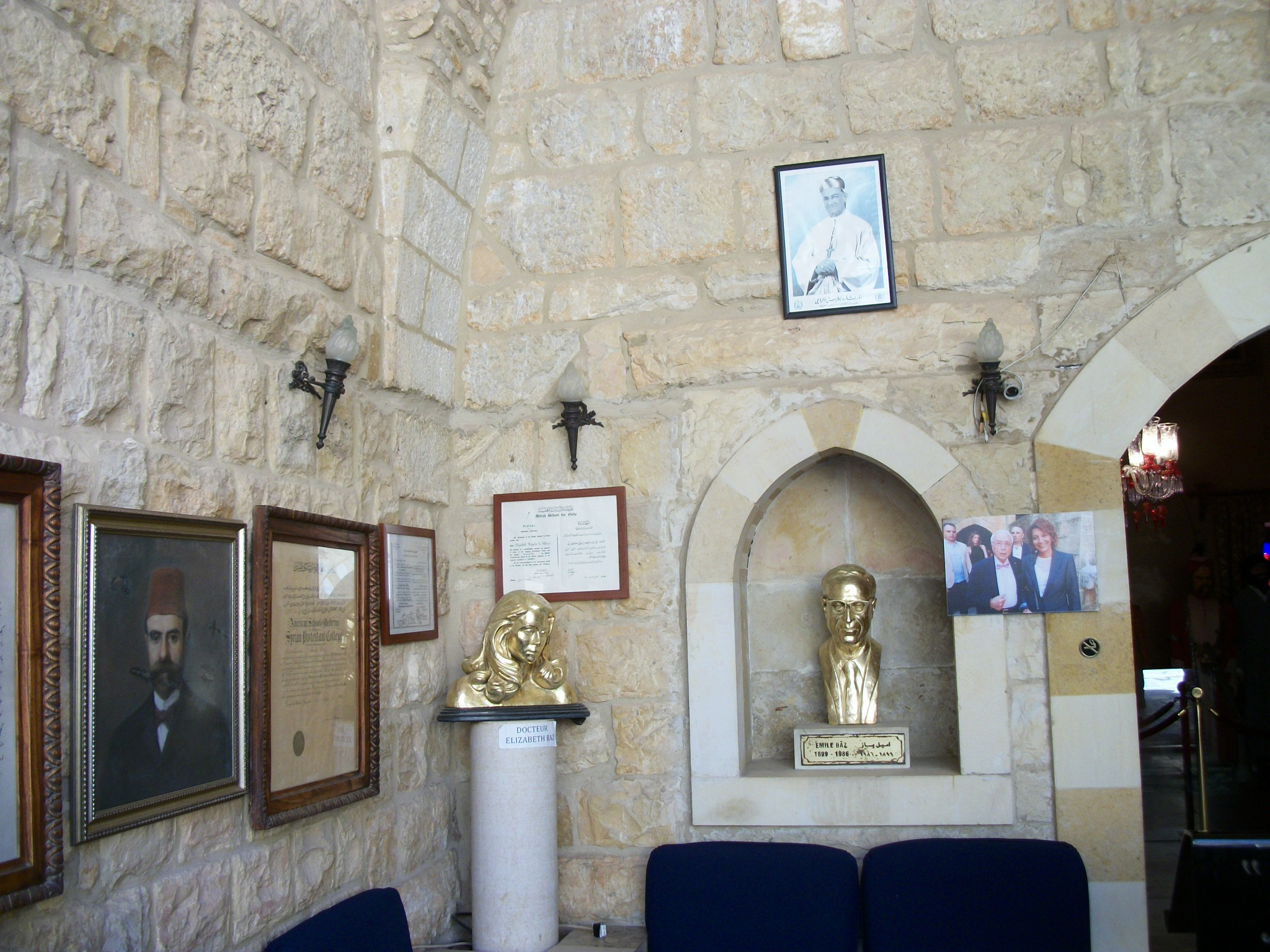
Baz family history room

== Image gallery ==
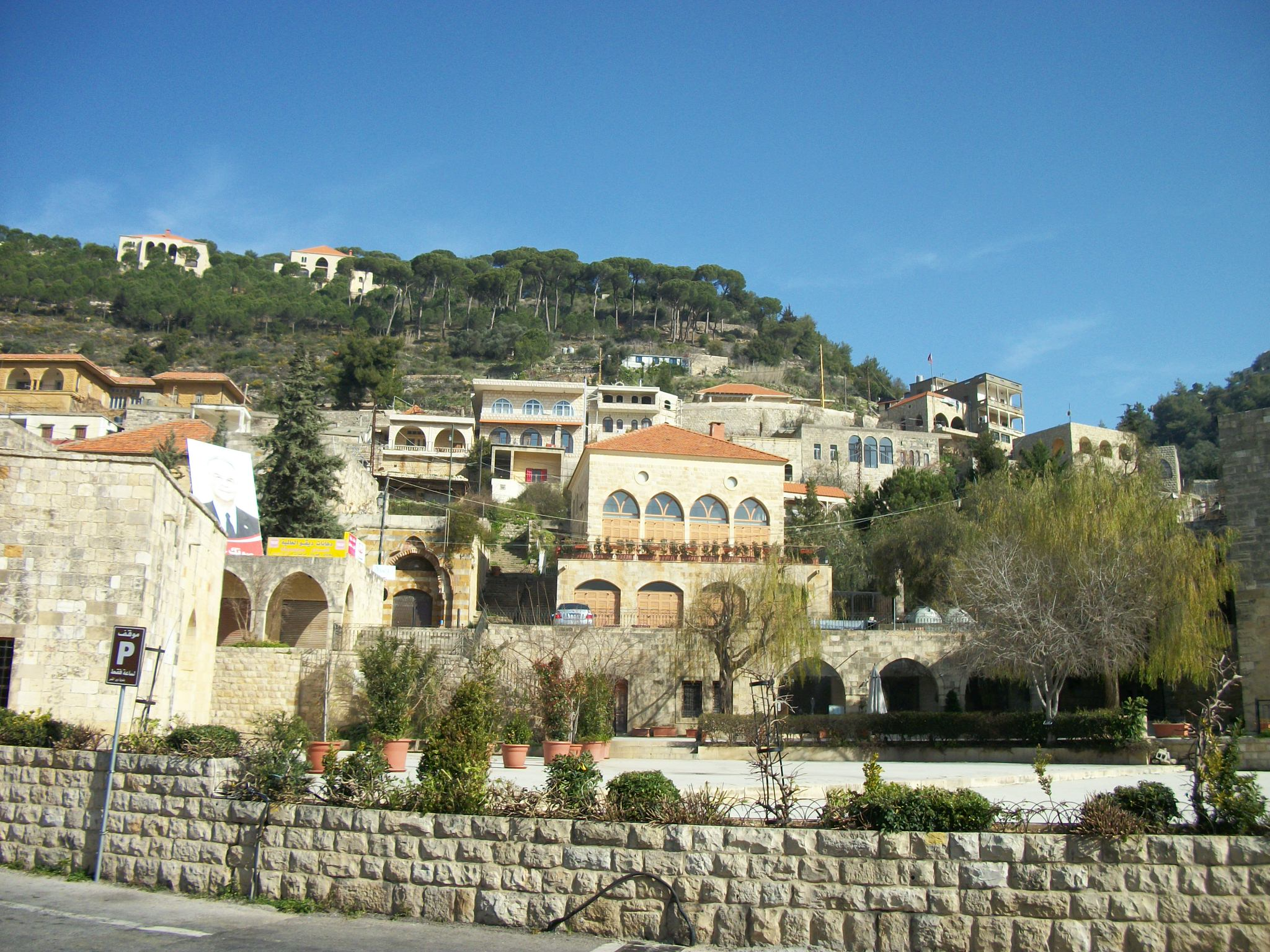
Old place Deir El-Qamar and houses in the background

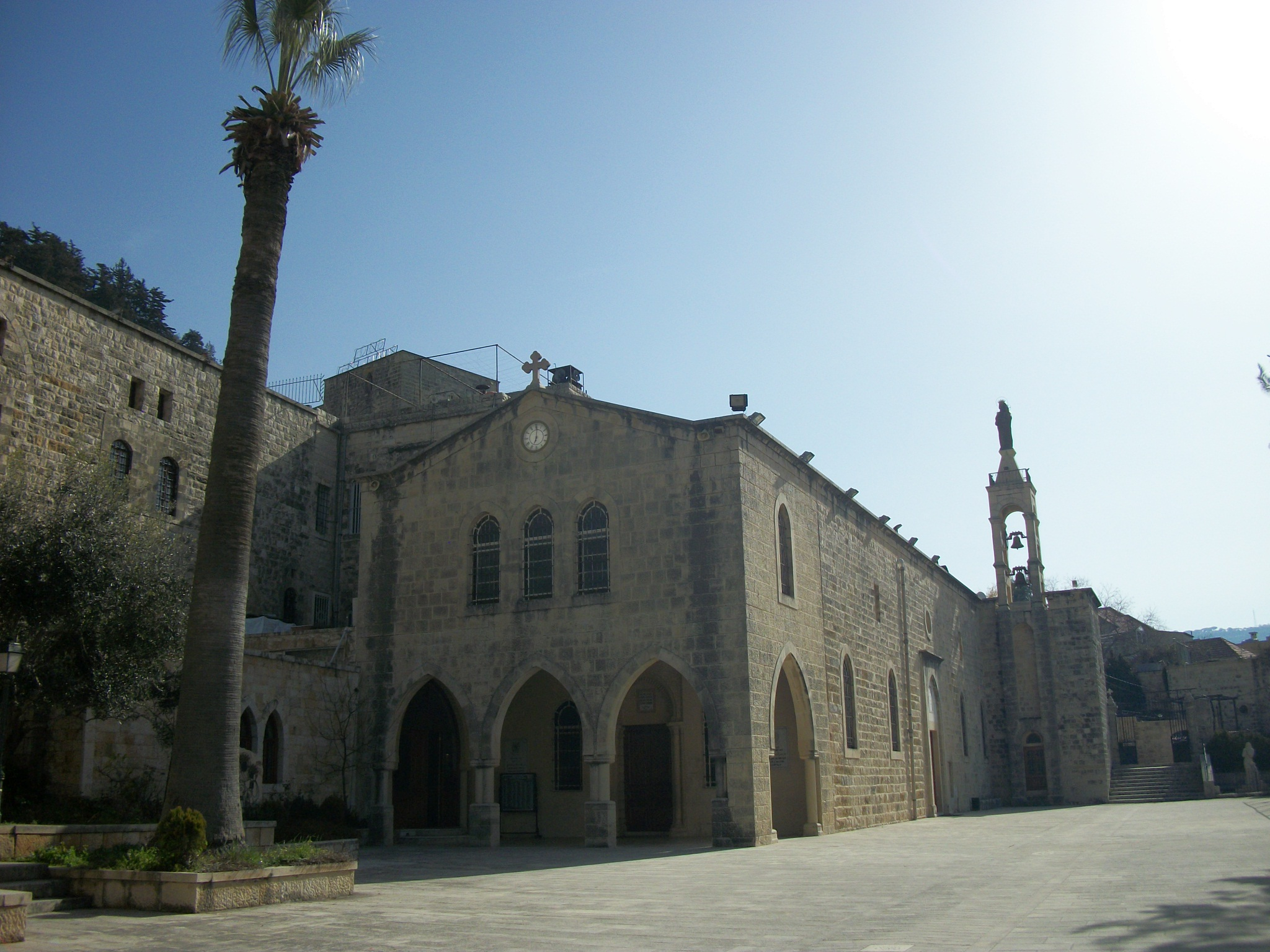
Maronite Church of Our Lady of the Hill

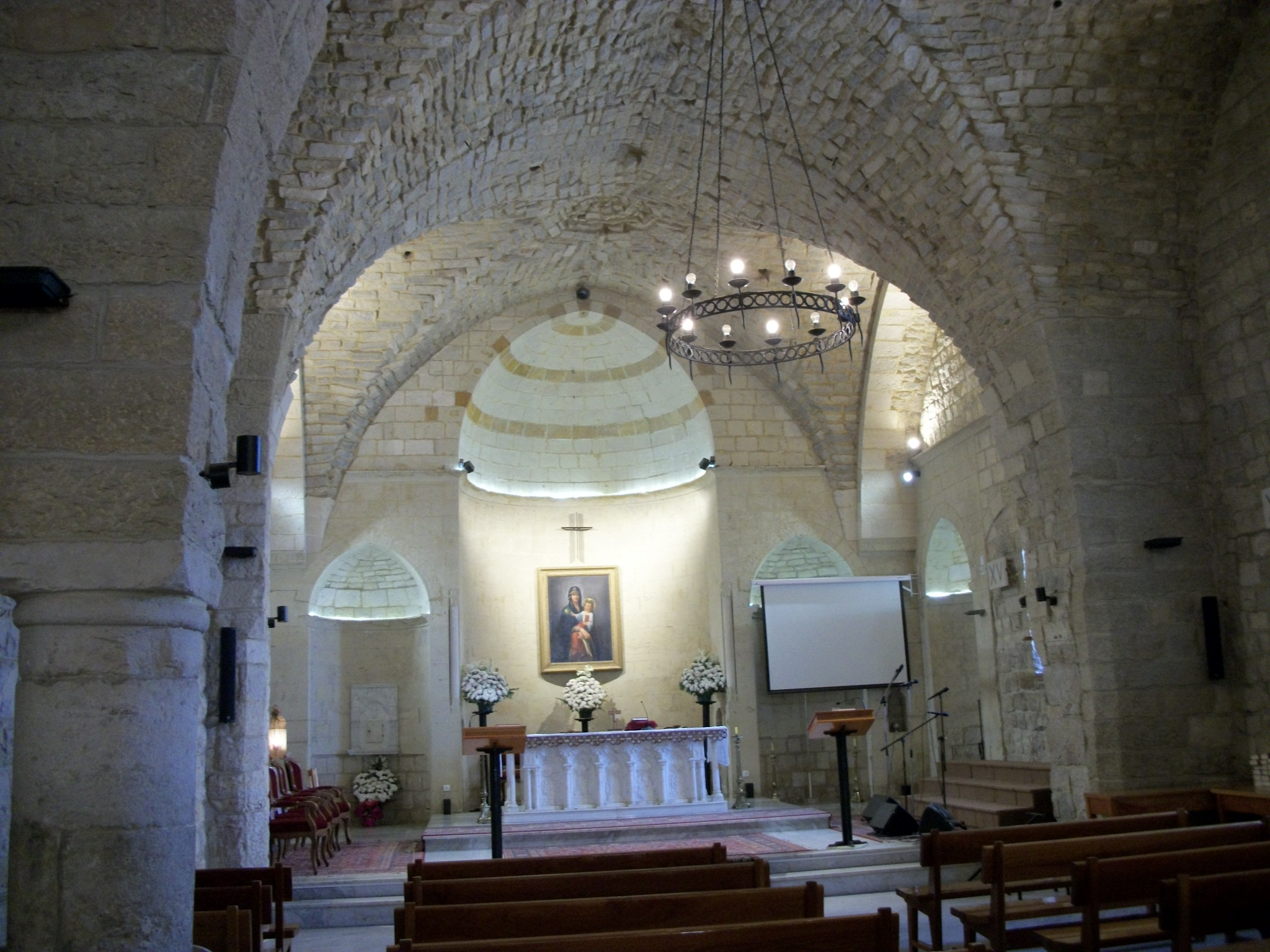
Interior of the Maronite Church of Our Lady of the Hill

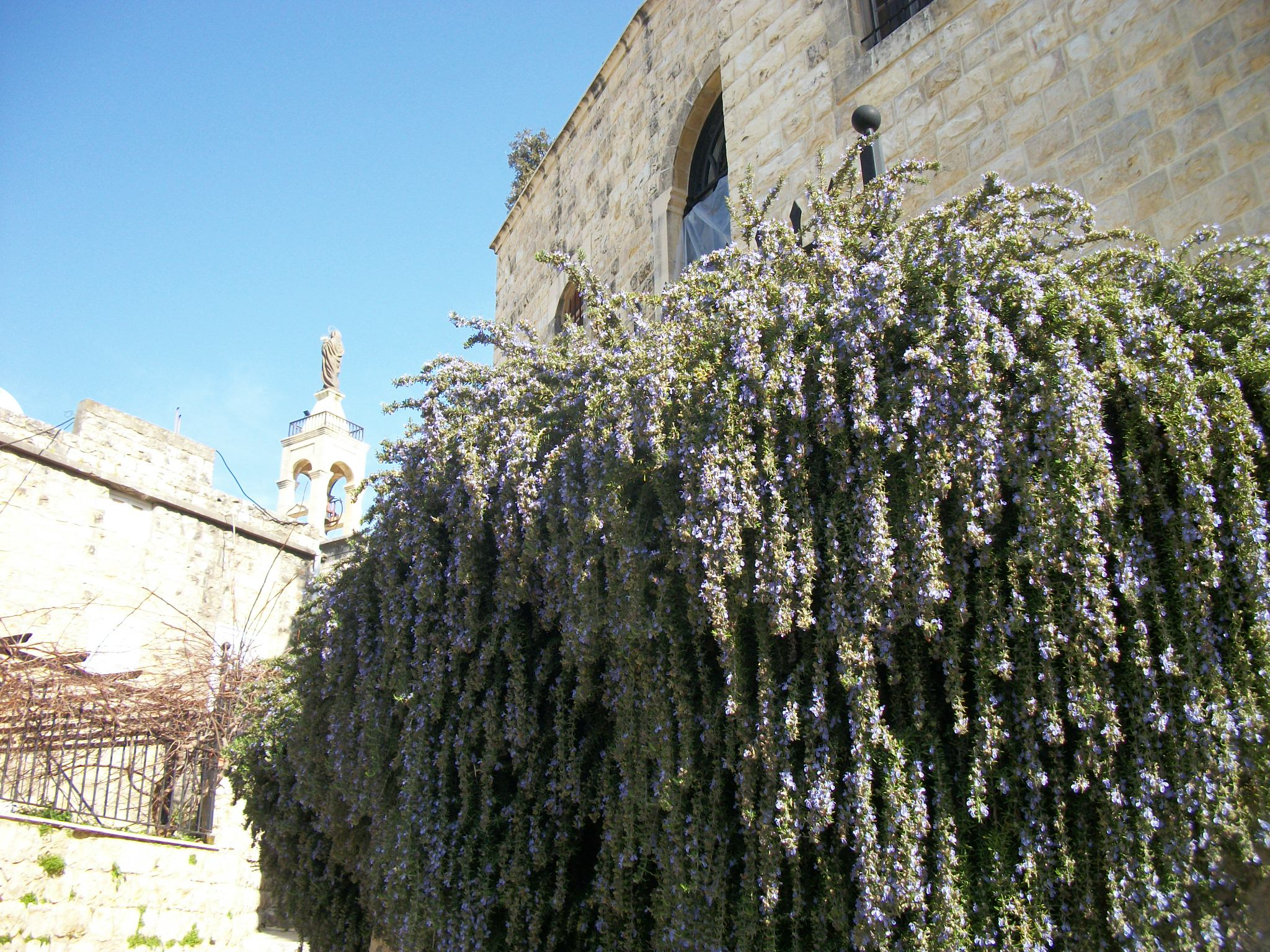
Rosemary in bloom in a street of Deir El-Qamar

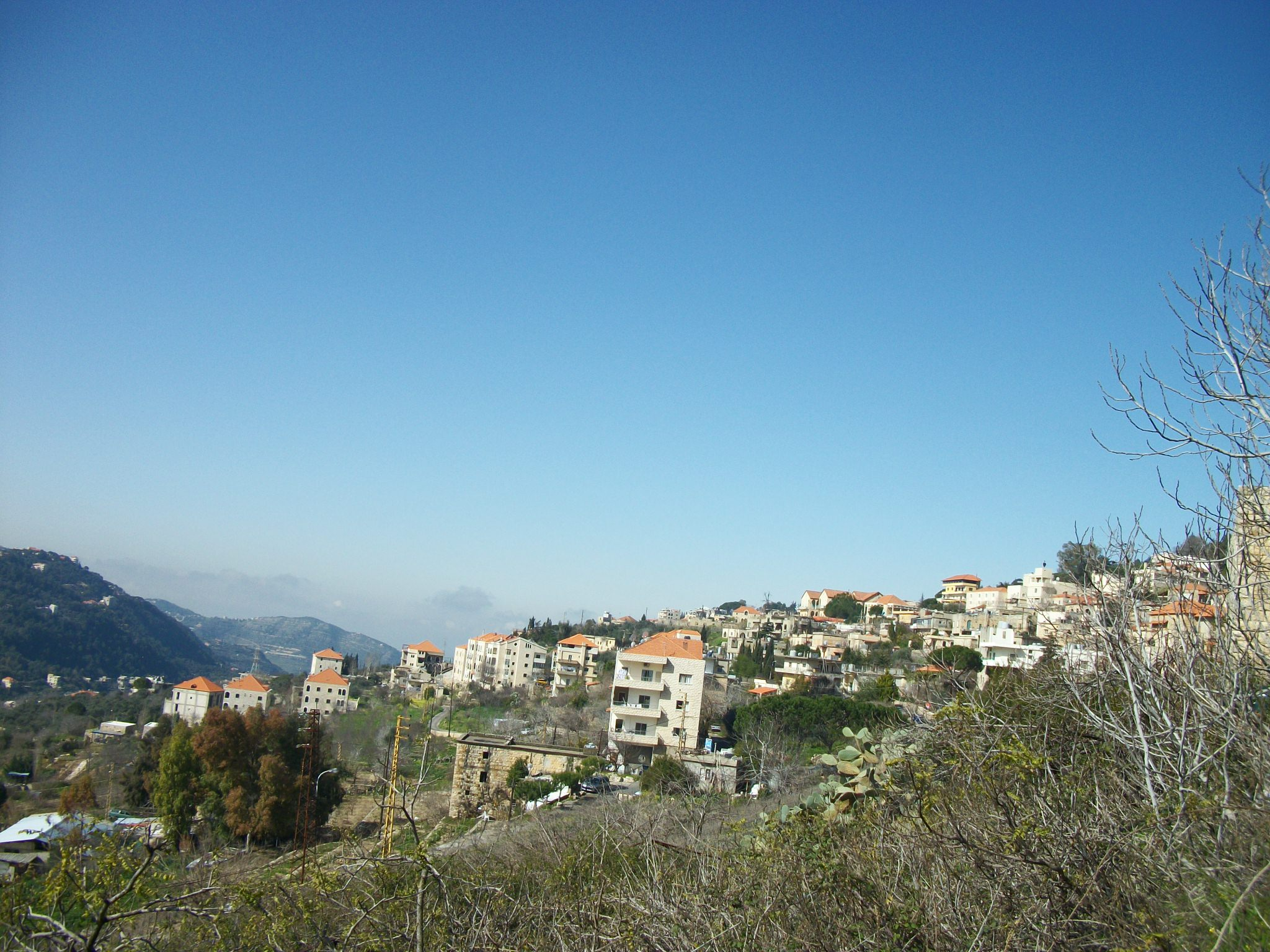
Overview of the city of Deir El-Qamar

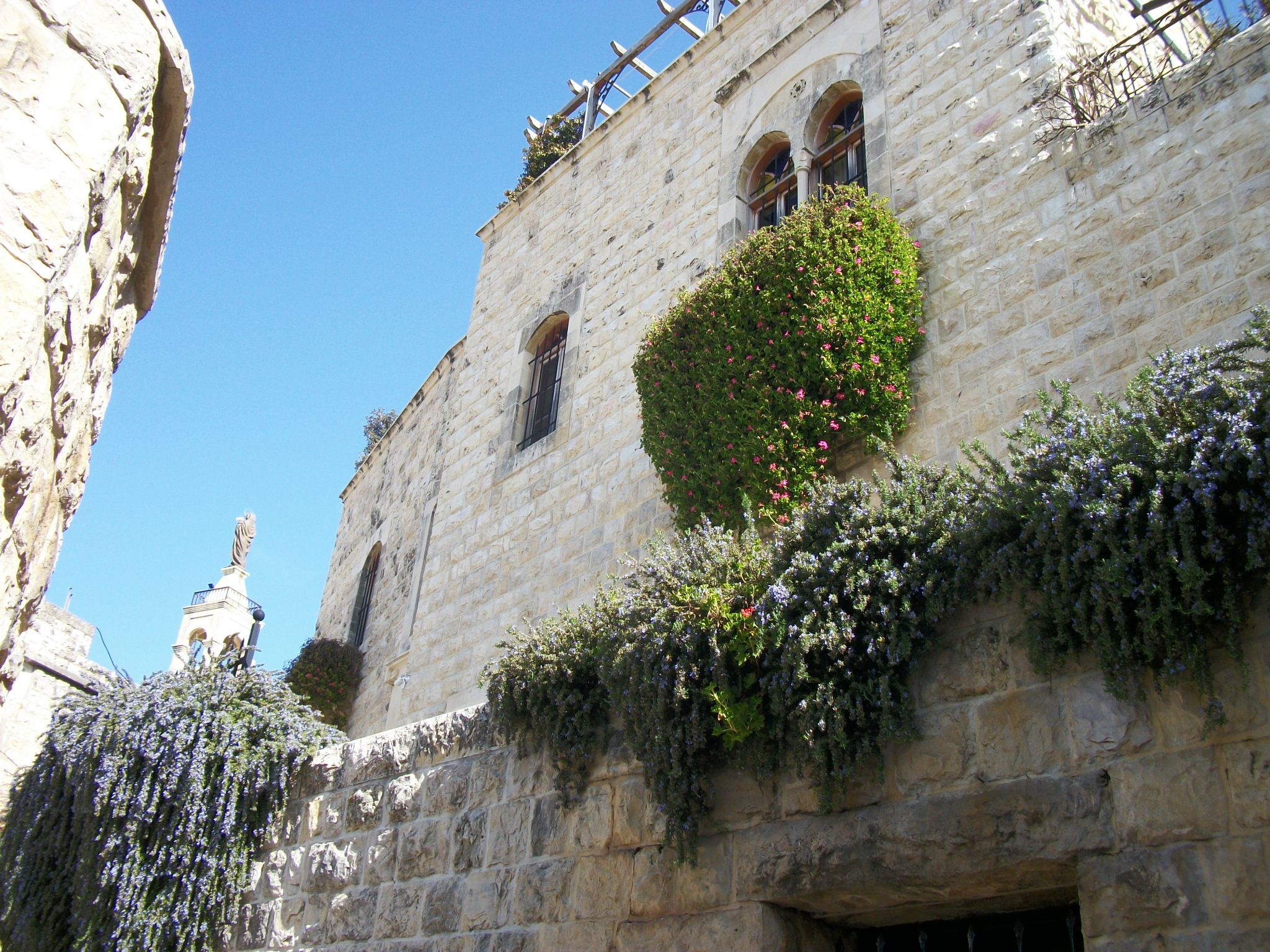
Green spaces in a street of Deir El-Qamar

Synagogue of Deir al-Qamar.

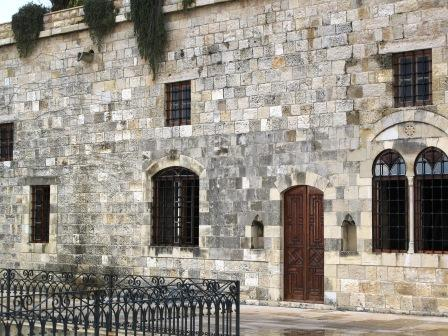
Synagogue of Deir al-Qamar.

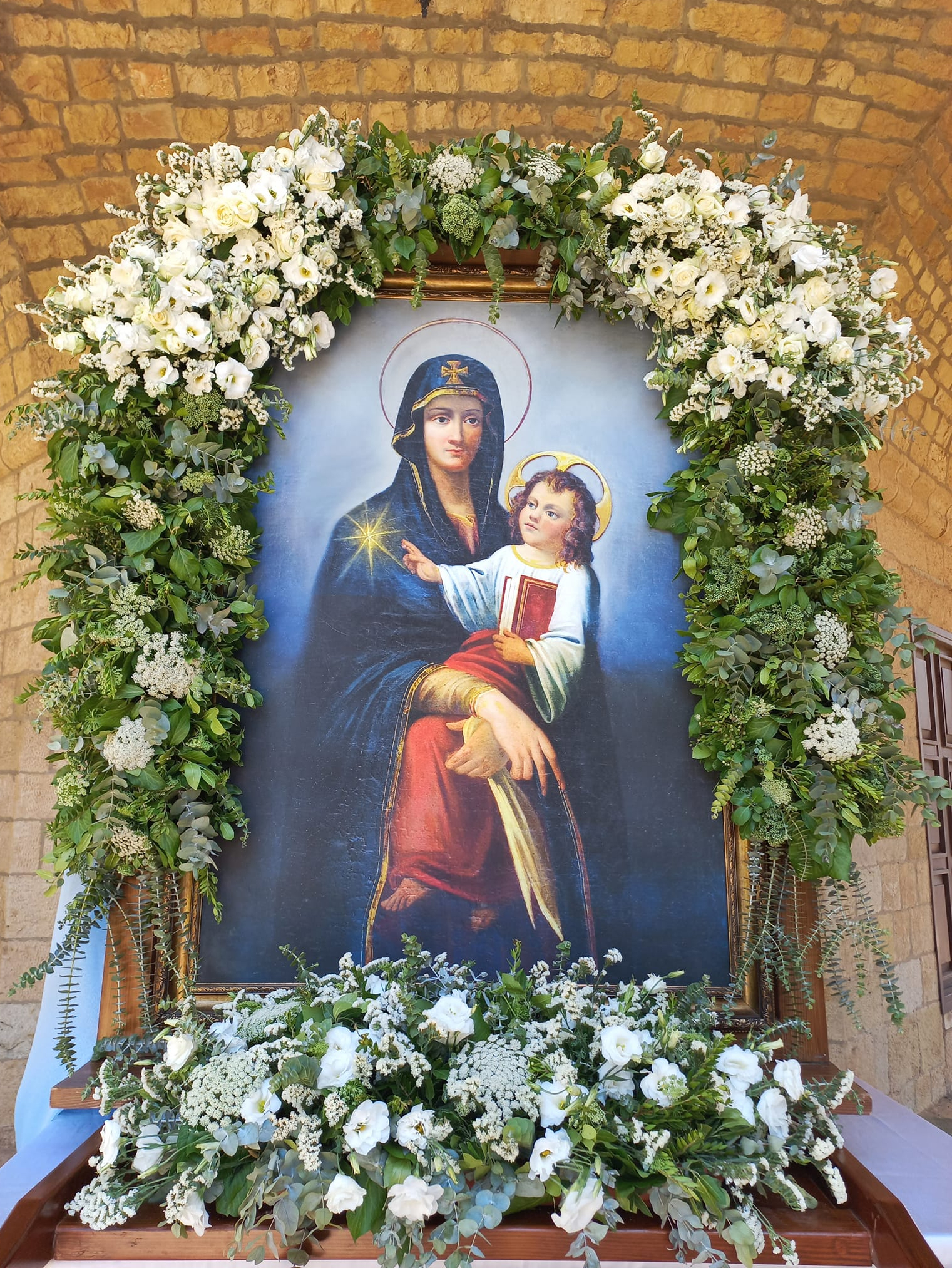
The icon of Saidet et Tallé, also known as "the Virgin of the Druze", is venerated by both the Druze and Christian communities in Lebanon.

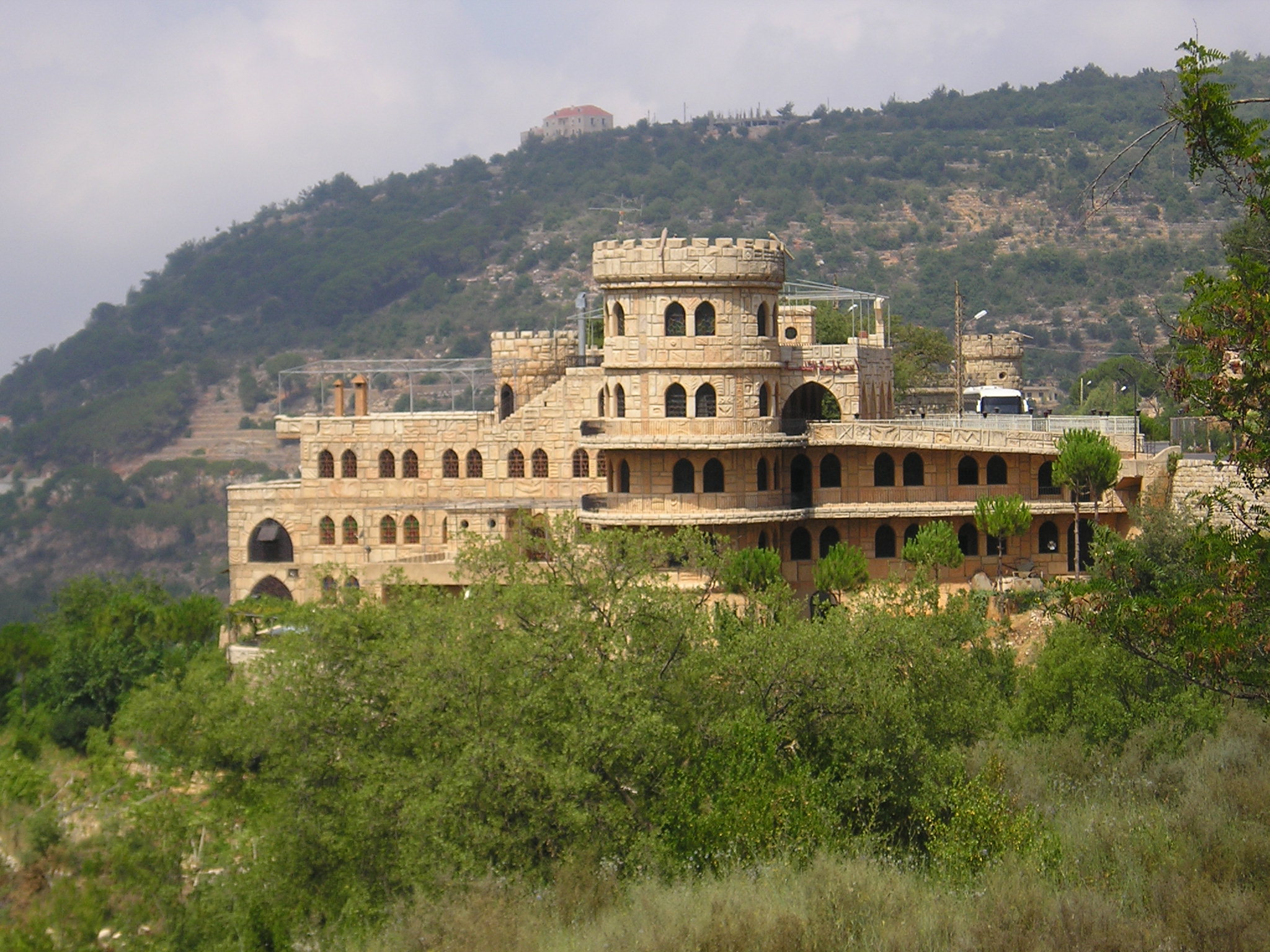
The whimsical Moussa Castle

== See also ==
- Church of Saidet et Tallé
- Deir el Qamar Synagogue
- Emirate of Mount Lebanon
- Fakhreddine II Palace
- Fakhreddine Mosque

== General and cited references ==
- Strehlke, E., ed. (1869). Tabulae Ordinis Theutonici ex tabularii regii Berolinensis codice potissimum. Berlin: Weidmanns. OCLC 857937930.
