= Fakhreddine Mosque =

Mosque in Deir al-Qamar, Lebanon

- Arabic: مسجد الأمير فخر الدين
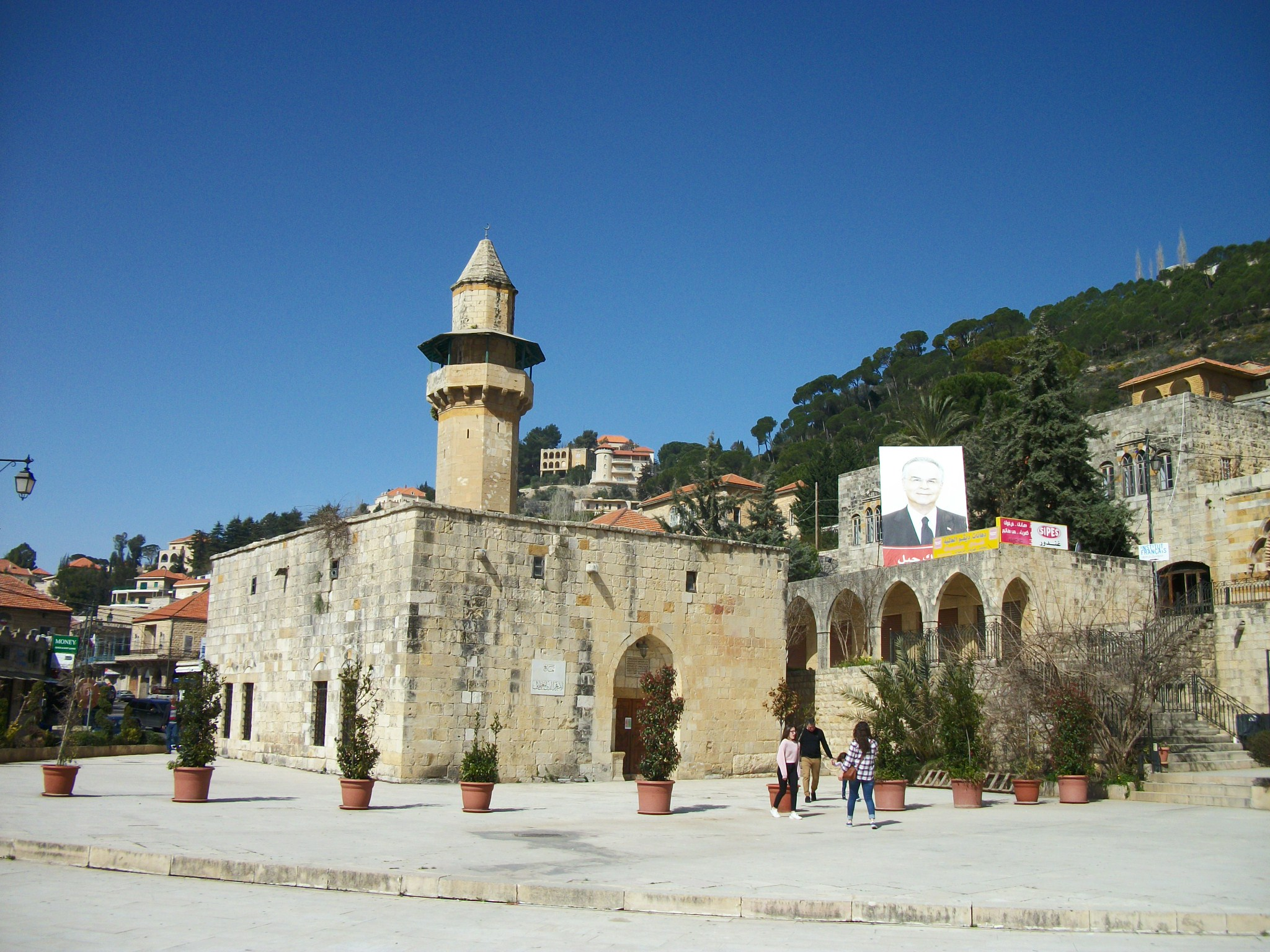

- Location of the mosque in Lebanon

Religion
- Affiliation: Sunni Islam
- Ecclesiastical or organisational status: Mosque
- Status: Active

Location
- Location: Deir al-Qamar, Chouf
- Country: Lebanon
- Coordinates: 33°41′53″N 35°33′52″E

Architecture
- Type: Mosque architecture
- Founder: Fakhr al-Din I
- Completed: 1493
- Minaret: One

The Fakhreddine Mosque (Arabic: مسجد الأمير فخر الدين) is a Sunni Islam mosque, located in Deir al-Qamar, Lebanon. Built in 1493 by Fakhr al-Din I and restored in the sixteenth century, it is the oldest mosque in Mount Lebanon. The mosque has an octagonal minaret.

== See also ==
- Fakhreddine Palace
- Islam in Lebanon
- List of mosques in Lebanon
