= Palace of Fakhr al-Din II =

Palace in Deyr el-Qamar, Lebanon

Coordinates: 33°41′52.39″N 35°33′55.79″E

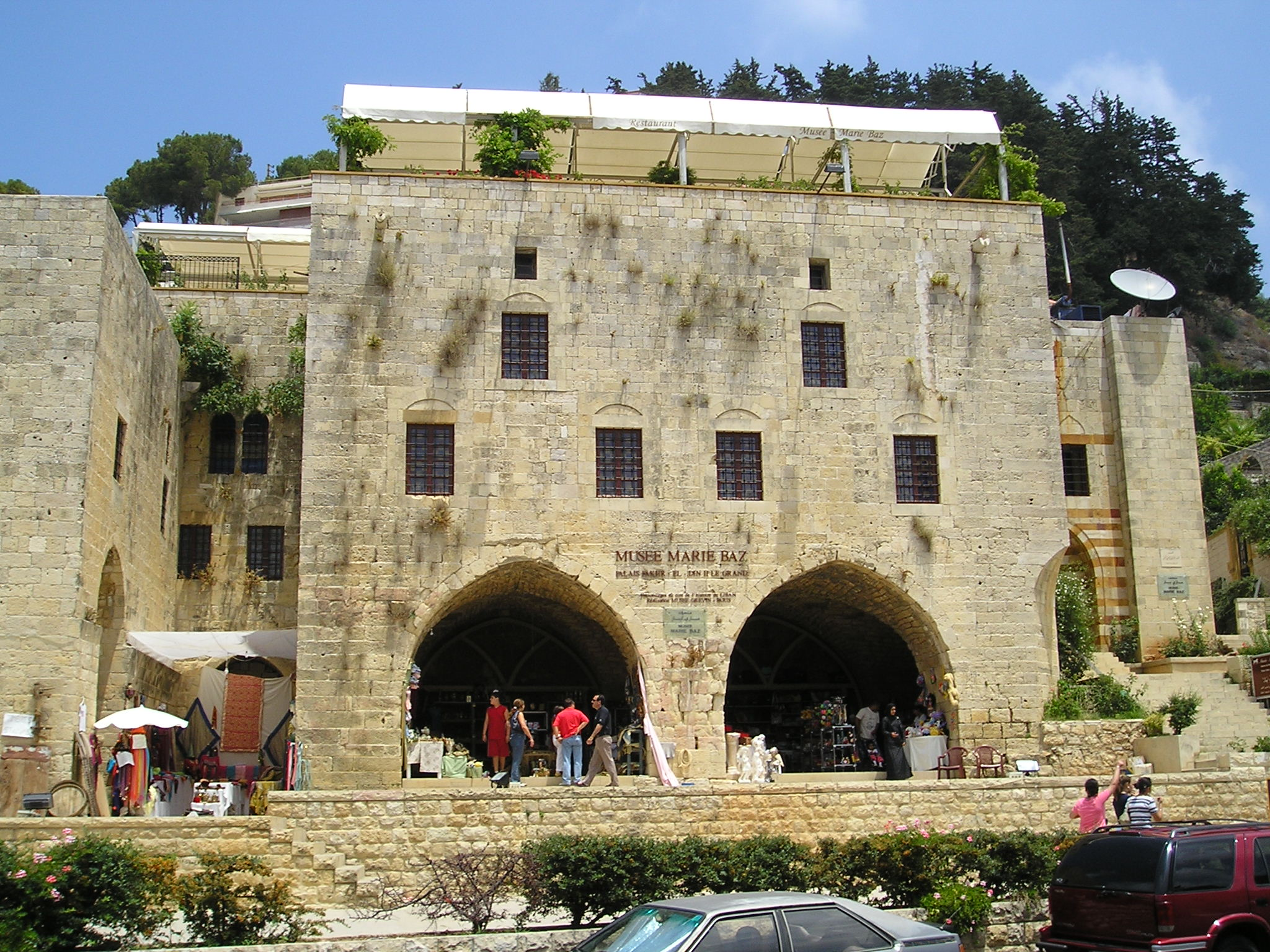
Fakhreddine II Palace

The Palace of Fakhr al-Din II is a 17th-century palace in Deir el Qamar, Chouf District, Lebanon. It was built by Emir Fakhr-al-Din II in the 17th century. It houses the Marie Baz Museum, a wax work museum.

== Names ==
The palace is known by several names; it is most commonly referred to as the Palace of Fakhr al-Din II (or Fakhr al-Din II Palace), after the Ma'nid emir who built it. The Austrian architect and scholar Friedrich Ragette identified the building in his 1974 work as the House of Emile Baz, referring to the then owner. The building is also associated with the Marie Baz Wax Museum.

== History ==
The palace was built in 1620 on the site of an earlier residence of Fakhr al-Din II. The previous palace had been destroyed in 1614 by Yusuf Sayfa the Ottoman multazim of the Tripoli region, in an effort to weaken Fakhr al-Din's authority. At the time, Fakhr al-Din was living in self-imposed exile in Italy. After his return in 1618, Fakhr al-Din retaliated against Sayfa and reused stone from the latter's palace in Akkar for the construction of his new residence at Deir al-Qamar. The material was reportedly transported to the town by some 20,000 defeated soldiers. In modern times, the building houses the Marie Baz Wax Museum, a collection of wax figures associated with Lebanese political, religious, and cultural history.

== Description ==
The palace is a fortified stone structure with an austere exterior and few openings. Architectural historian Elie Haddad compares its design to Egyptian Mamluk building traditions rather than to Tuscan or Italian Renaissance architecture, with which Fakhr al-Din's building projects have been associated. The main decorative feature is the entrance portal, framed by alternating ablaq bands of white and yellow limestone. Haddad argues that the building shows the limited extent of Tuscan influence on the palatial architecture of seventeenth-century Mount Lebanon.

== See also ==
- Fakhreddine Mosque
