= Fakhr al-Din I =

Druze emir

Emir of the Chouf
- Successor: Yunis ibn Fakhr al-Din
- Died: 1506
- Issue: Yunis
- House: Ma'n
- Father: Al-Hajj Yunis Ma'n
- Religion: Druze

Fakhr al-Din Uthman ibn al-Hajj Yunis Ibn Ma'n (Arabic: فخر الدين عثمان بن الحاج يونس بن معن), also known as Fakhr al-Din I, was the Druze emir of the Chouf district in southern Mount Lebanon from at least the early 1490s until his death in 1506, during Mamluk rule. He was the head of the Ma'n family, whose emirs are traditionally held to have controlled the Chouf since 1120. He is credited by an inscription for building a mosque in Deir al-Qamar in 1493. Fakhr al-Din was briefly imprisoned by the Mamluk authorities in 1505 in relation to his alliance with the Bedouin Bani al-Hansh clan against the Mamluk-appointed, Druze governor of Beirut.

Before modern research by Kamal Salibi, most modern historians, including Salibi initially, based their information about Fakhr al-Din on the 19th-century works of local historian Haydar al-Shihabi, who confused him with his grandson, Qurqumaz ibn Yunis, and placed his death in 1544.

== Family origins ==
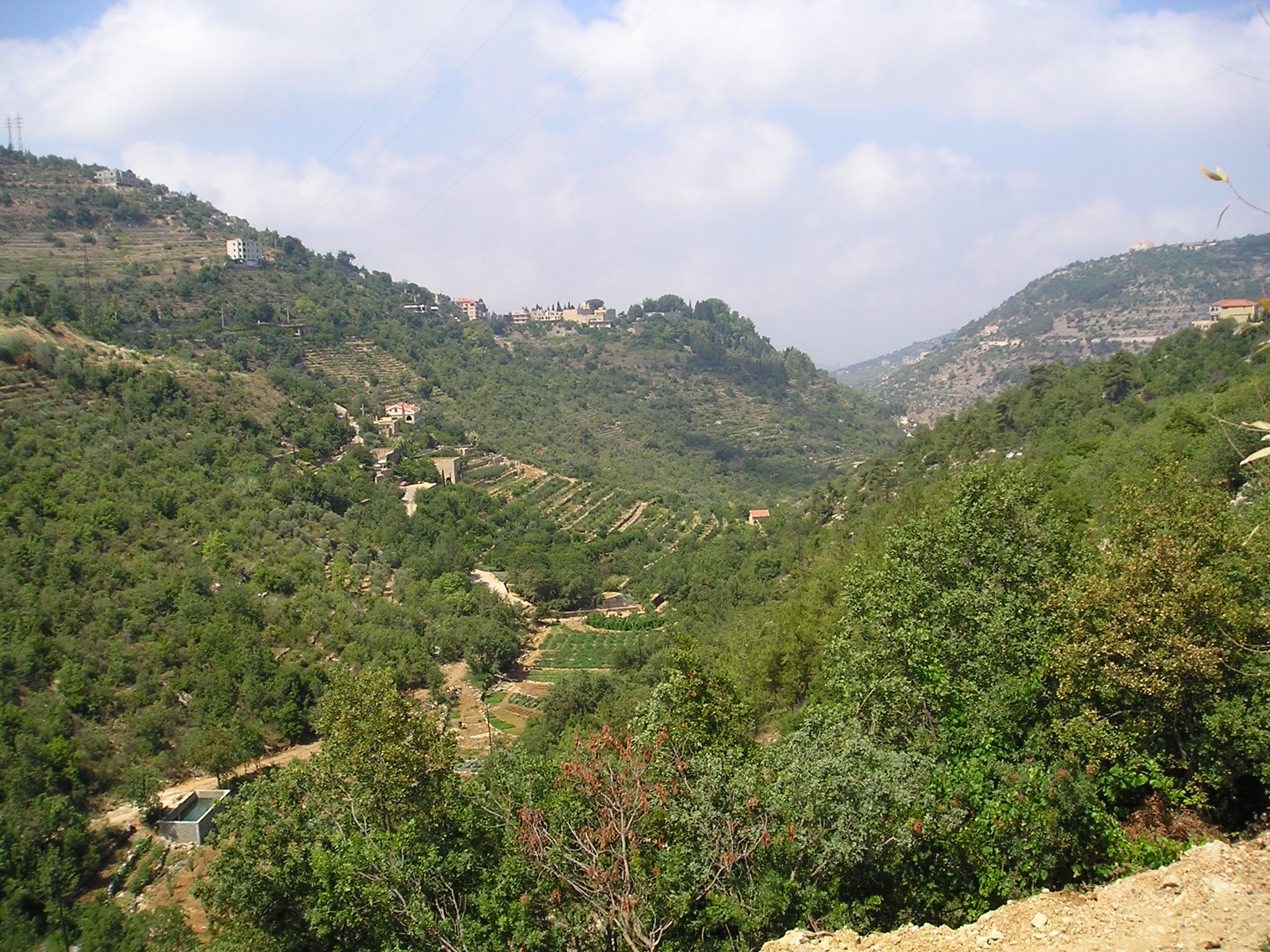
From 1120, the Chouf mountains in southern Mount Lebanon were controlled by the emirs of the Ma'n family, including Fakhr al-Din

The Ma'n family, to which Fakhr al-Din belonged, established itself in the Chouf (Shuf) area in southern Mount Lebanon, where they founded their headquarters at Baaqlin, in 1120. The progenitor of the family had fought against the Crusaders near Antioch and was sent to Mount Lebanon by the Muslim Burid emirs of Damascus to reinforce the position of the Tanukhids in the Gharb area (around Aley) against the Crusaders in Beirut. They formed marital ties with the Tanukhids and were assisted by the Tanukhid emir Buhtur in building permanent dwellings.

== Sources and identification ==
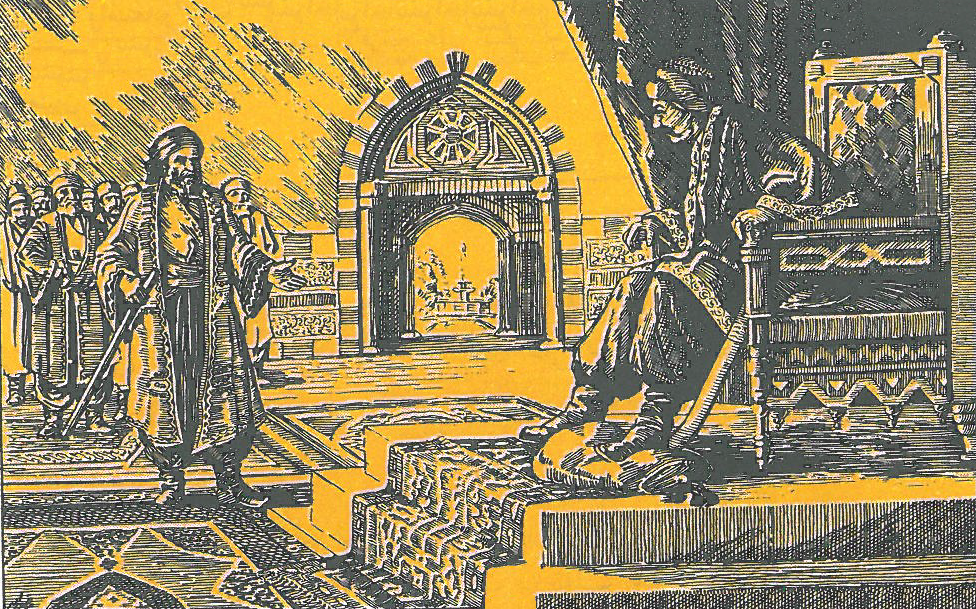
Artistic rendition of Fakhr al-Din appearing before Sultan Selim I in 1516. Modern historians have shown that this meeting did not occur as Fakhr al-Din died in 1506. One of his descendants, Qurqumaz, rebelled and was temporarily in Selim's custody in 1518.

Modern sources largely derive information about the Ma'nid period in Mount Lebanon preceding the rule of Fakhr al-Din ibn Qurqumaz (Fakhr al-Din II) from the 19th-century works of Haydar al-Shihabi (d. 1835) and Tannus al-Shidyaq (d. 1861). Al-Shihabi and al-Shidyaq chronicle a Ma'nid emir named Fakhr al-Din ibn Uthman, who was also referred to by historians as Fakhr al-Din I to distinguish him from his better-known descendant, Fakhr al-Din II. According to al-Shihabi, the emir was recognized as the preeminent Druze emir (prince or commander) of Mount Lebanon by the Ottoman sultan Selim I upon his conquest of Damascus in 1517 and that he died in 1544. According to research by the modern historian Kamal Salibi, Fakhr al-Din I's actual name was "Fakhr al-Din Uthman" and he died in 1506, the year 1544 having seemingly been "chosen at random" by al-Shihabi. The figure of Fakhr al-Din I that historians, including Peter Malcolm Holt, Phillip Hitti, Henri Lammens, Ferdinand Wustenfeld, and Salibi himself in his article on "Fakhr al-Din" in the Encyclopedia of Islam, acknowledged was actually Emir Qurqumaz, who died in 1586. Salibi attributes the historical mistake to al-Shihabi's work. The historian Clifford Edmund Bosworth writes that Salibi "convincingly argues that the Fakhr al-Din I (b.) Uthman who is supposed to have submitted to the Ottoman Sultan Selim the Grim in 1517 at Damascus and to have been confirmed in the chieftainship of the Jebel Druze [Mount Lebanon], cannot have been reigning at that time".

== Biography ==
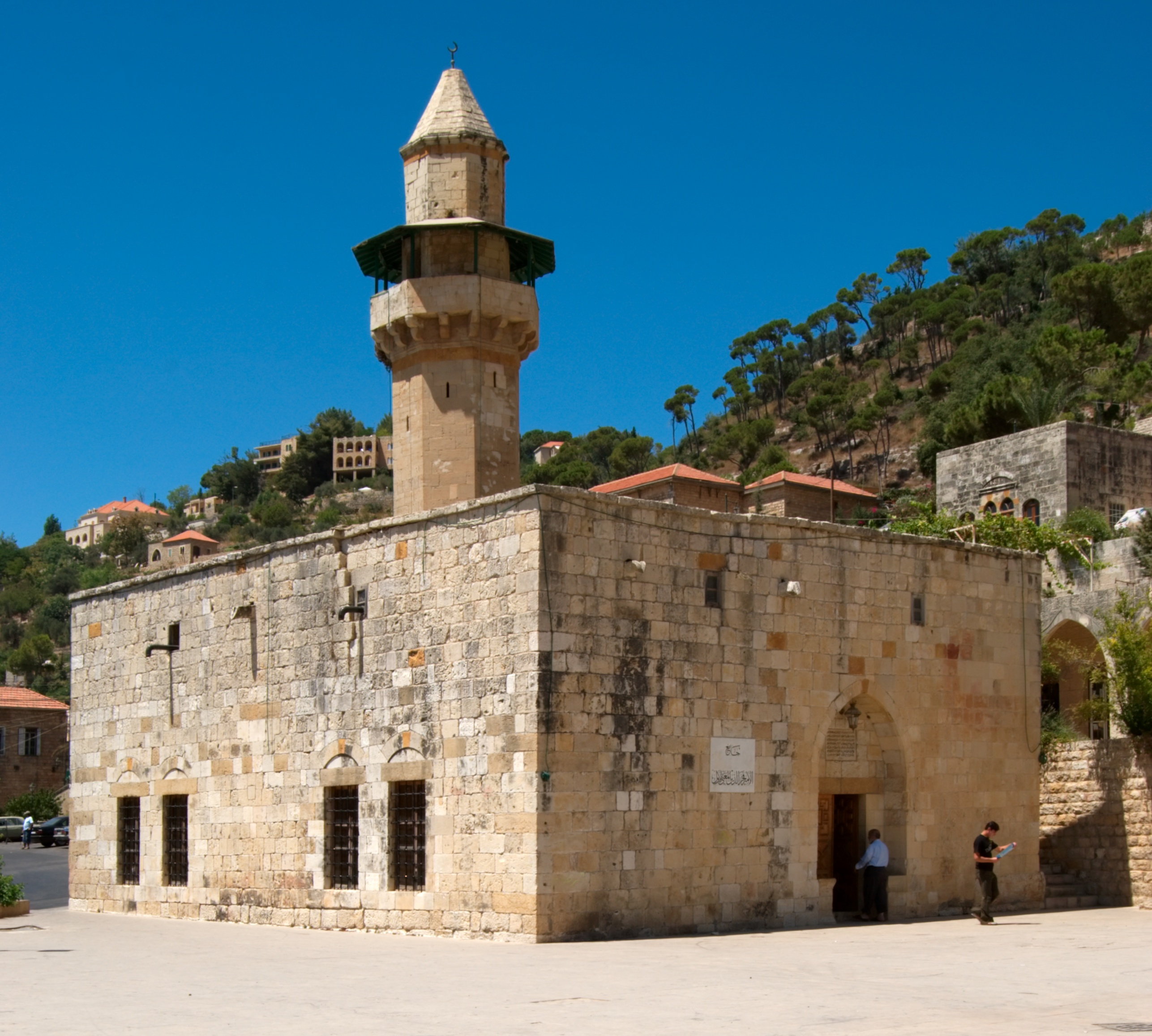
Fakhreddine Mosque in Deir al-Qamar, built by Fakhr al-Din in 1493

According to Salibi, Fakhr al-Din was the first Ma'nid "whose historicity is beyond question". He ruled the Chouf in the late Mamluk period (1260–1517) until his death in August/September 1506, a decade before the Ottoman conquest. The local Druze chronicler Ibn Sibat (d. 1520) indicated that Fakhr al-Din's given name was Uthman, while "Fakhr al-Din" was a laqab (honorific) meaning "pride of the faith". Ibn Sibat referred to him as the "emir of the Chouf in the region of Sidon" who died in 1506. A 1493 inscription on a mosque in Deir al-Qamar credits "al-Maqarr al-Fakhri [the Fakhrid Seat] Emir Fakhr al-Din Uthman" as its builder and further notes that he was the "son of al-Hajj Yunis ibn Ma'n". Both Fakhr al-Din and his father lived during the era of the prominent Druze reformer Jamal al-Din Abdullah al-Tanukhi (d. 1479), who urged his coreligionists to engage in Muslim religious practices, hence the usage of the honorary title al-Hajj (one who has completed the Hajj pilgrimage to Mecca) by Yunis and the construction of a mosque, which were not used by the Druze, by Fakhr al-Din.

According to the historian William Harris, in the 1490s Fakhr al-Din entered into an alliance with the Bani al-Hansh, a Sunni Muslim clan that controlled most of the Beqaa Valley at the time. The Bani al-Hansh were at war with the Buhturids (descendants of Jumayhur Buhtur) led by Jamal al-Din Hajji, the Mamluk-appointed governor of Beirut between the 1490s and 1512. In July 1496 he was summoned with other Syrian chieftains to Damascus by its viceroy Qansuh al-Yahyawi, according to the Damascene chronicler al-Busrawi (d. 1500), for unclear reasons. The Damascene chroniclers Ibn al-Himsi (d. 1527) and Ibn Tulun (d. 1546) hold that in the following year, he joined the rebellion of the Mamluk officer Akbirdi when the latter besieged Damascus; Akbirdi died of natural causes in 1498 and Fakhr al-Din was imprisoned in the Citadel of Damascus with other Syrian chieftains on 17 April 1499 for their participation in the rebellion. Fakhr al-Din was imprisoned by the Mamluk authorities in 1505, the year the Bani al-Hansh raided Jamal al-Din's soap stockpiles in Beirut. The Mamluks nonetheless held him in high esteem and he was released shortly after "covered with honor", according to al-Shidyaq. The latter remarked on Fakhr al-Din's emergence as "the sun setting on the Tanukh [Buhturid] emirate and rising on the Ma'n emirate".

== Succession ==
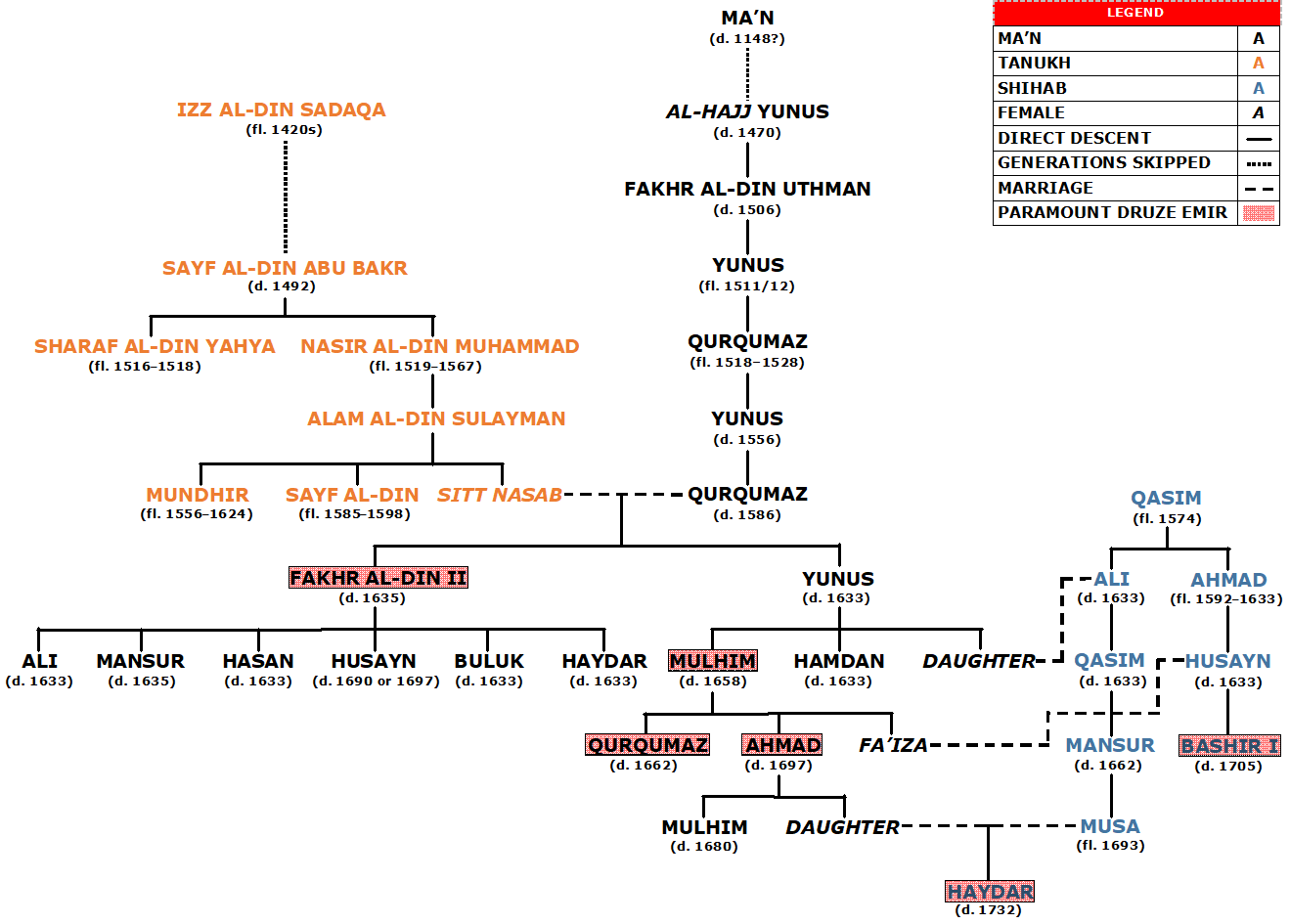
Genealogical tree of the Ma'n dynasty

Fakhr al-Din was succeeded by his son Yunis, who according to Ibn Sibat died "a young man of reverence, power, and dignity" in 1511-12. Although Shihabi claimed that a certain "Fakhr al-Din ibn Uthman" was summoned by Sultan Selim I upon his conquest of Mamluk Syria in 1517, the 17th-century Maronite patriarch and historian Istifan al-Duwayhi wrote that it was "Emir Qurqumaz son of Emir Yunis ibn Ma'n" who was actually summoned. Salibi considers it plausible that Yunis, the father of Qurqumaz, was the son of Fakhr al-Din Uthman as it conformed with a widespread Arab tradition in which the eldest son names his eldest son after his father.

The chronicle of Duwayhi indicates that Qurqumaz succeeded Yunis and continued to hold the emirate of the Chouf in 1528, though it contains no information about the Chouf emirate between then and 1586, when Shihabi and Shidyaq hold Qurqumaz died (Duwayhi places his death in 1584). In the assessment of Salibi, Shihabi likely erred in the reconstruction of the Ma'nid family due to the exceptionally long reign of Qurqumaz (1511–1586). Salibi surmises that Qurqumaz succeeded his father while a young child and must have been assisted in ruling the emirate by his close Ma'nid kinsman Alam al-Din Sulayman (likely an uncle or cousin), who was mentioned by Ibn Sibat as having been imprisoned relatively briefly with Qurqumaz by Janbirdi al-Ghazali, the Ottoman governor of Damascus, in 1518.

== Bibliography ==
- Bosworth, Clifford Edmund (2006). An Intrepid Scot: William Lithgow of Lanark's Travels in the Ottoman Lands, North Africa and Central Europe, 1609–21. Hants, England and Burlington, Vermont: Ashgate Publishing. ISBN 0-7546-5708-6.
- Harris, William (2012). Lebanon: A History, 600 - 2011. New York: Oxford University Press. ISBN 978-0-19-518-111-1.
- Hourani, Alexander (2010). New Documents on the History of Mount Lebanon and Arabistan in the 10th and 11th Centuries H. Beirut.
- Salibi, K. (1965). "Fakhr al-Dīn". In Lewis, B.; Pellat, Ch. & Schacht, J. (eds.). The Encyclopaedia of Islam, Second Edition. Volume II: C–G. Leiden: E. J. Brill. pp. 749–751. OCLC 495469475.
- Salibi, K. (1991). "Maʿn". In Bosworth, C. E.; van Donzel, E. & Pellat, Ch. (eds.). The Encyclopaedia of Islam, Second Edition. Volume VI: Mahk–Mid. Leiden: E. J. Brill. pp. 343–344. ISBN 978-90-04-08112-3.
- Salibi, Kamal S. (July 1973). "The Secret of the House of Ma'n". International Journal of Middle East Studies. 4 (3): 272–287. doi:10.1017/S0020743800031469. JSTOR 162160. S2CID 163020137.
- Salibi, Kamal S. (2005). A House of Many Mansions: The History of Lebanon Reconsidered. I.B. Tauris. ISBN 978-1-86064-912-7.
- Sluglett, Peter (2010). "Introduction". In Sluglett, Peter; Weber, Stefan (eds.). Syria and Bilad Al-Sham Under Ottoman Rule: Essays in Honour of Abdul Karim Rafeq. Leiden: Brill. ISBN 978-90-04-18193-9.
