= Buhturids =

Medieval dynasty in Levant (12th–15th)

The Buhturids (Arabic: بنو بُحتر, romanized: Banū Buḥtur) or the Tanukh (Arabic: تنوخ, romanized: Tanūkh) were an Arab dynasty from the Tanukh tribe.

The Buhturids were the chiefs and emirs (princes or commanders) of the Gharb area southeast of Beirut in Mount Lebanon in the 12th–15th centuries. They were established in the Gharb by the Muslim atabegs of Damascus after the capture of Beirut by the Crusaders in 1110.

Their presence was solidified in the area as they were tasked with guarding the mountainous frontier between the Crusader coastlands and the Muslim interior of the Levant. As such, they were granted iqtas (revenue fiefs) over villages in the Gharb and command over its peasant warriors, who subscribed to the Druze religion, which the Buhturids followed. Their iqtas were successively confirmed, decreased or increased by the Burid, Zengid, Ayyubid and Mamluk rulers of Damascus in return for military service and intelligence gathering in the war with the Crusader lordships of Beirut and Sidon. In times of peace the Buhturids maintained working relations with the Crusaders.

The Buhturids' peak of power occurred under the Circassian Mamluk sultan Barquq (r. 1382–1389, 1390–1399), whom they supported during his seizure of power from his Turkic predecessors. During this period, the Buhturids grew their wealth through commercial enterprises, exporting silk, olive oil, and soap to Mamluk officials in Egypt from Beirut and attaining the governorship of Beirut twice, in the 1420s and 1490s–1500s. They were respected by the peasants of the Gharb for safeguarding their interests against government measures, promoting agriculture, and checking their local rivals, the Turkmen emirs of the Keserwan. During the closing years of Mamluk rule, Buhturid influence receded to the benefit of their old allies, the Druze Ma'n dynasty of the Chouf. They continued to control the Gharb through Ottoman rule until the family was massacred by the Druze chief Ali Alam al-Din in 1633.

== Origins ==
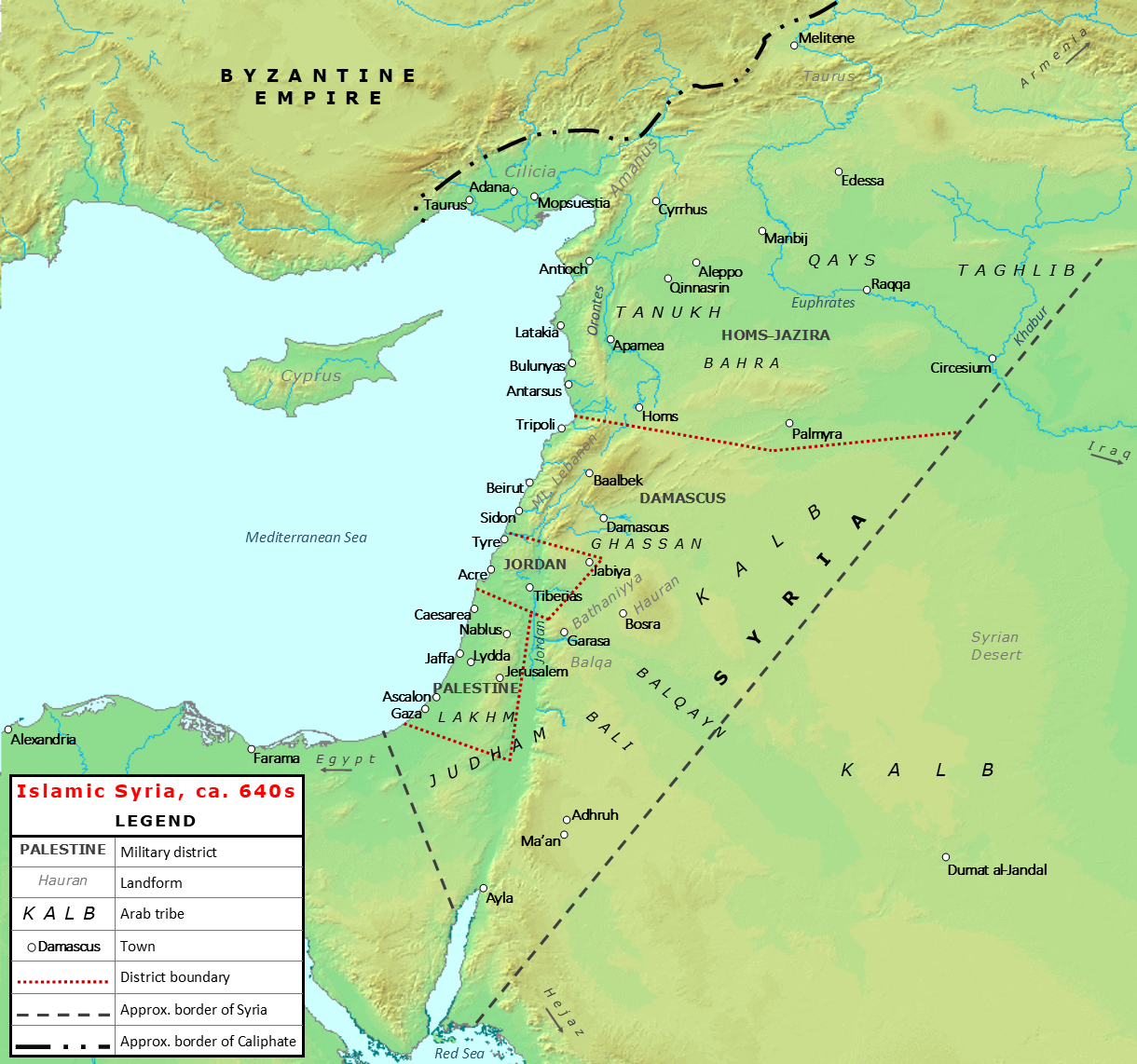
Map of the early Islamic Levant. The Tanukh encamped near Aleppo and Qinnasrin throughout Byzantine and Umayyad rule until migrating to the mountains northwest of Homs in the late 8th century

The Buhturids were a clan of the Tanukh, (Note: As the history of the Buhturids was first recorded in the 15th and 16th centuries by the local Druze chroniclers Salih ibn Yahya and Ibn Sibat, the historian Kais Firro questions whether the Buhturids' actual kinship to the Tanukh of southern Mount Lebanon, who are mentioned in 11th-century Druze scriptures, was an invention of these chroniclers.) an Arab tribal confederation whose presence in the Levant dated to at least the 4th century CE when they served as the first Arab foederati (tribal confederates) of the Byzantine Empire. At the time, the Tanukh were ardent Orthodox Christians, and remained in Byzantine service until the Muslim conquest of the Levant in the 630s. Although part of the confederation fled to Byzantine Anatolia, they primarily remained in their dwelling places around Aleppo and Qinnasrin (Chalcis) in the northern Levant and eventually allied with the Levant-based Umayyad Caliphate (661–750) while largely retaining their Christian faith. After the execution of their preeminent chieftain Layth ibn Mahatta by the Iraq-based Abbasid caliph al-Mahdi (r. 775–785) for refusing to embrace Islam, the tribe converted and their churches were destroyed. During the reign of al-Mahdi's son, Harun al-Rashid (r. 786–809), the Tanukh's settlements were raided by rebels, forcing their flight from the Qinnasrin area to the northern Levantine coastal mountains, which were thenceforth called 'Jabal Tanukh' or 'Jabal Bahra' after the Tanukh and the tribe of Bahra.

=== Establishment in the Gharb ===
The Tanukh's entry into the area of modern Lebanon, which was just south of Jabal Tanukh, was "the last stage of their historical role in Bilad al-Sham [the Islamic Levant]", according to the historian Irfan Shahid. The Sijill al-Arslani (genealogical registers of the Arslan family of Choueifat) states that the Tanukh began moving into Mount Lebanon under the Abbasid caliph al-Mansur (r. 754–775), who ordered a number of the tribe's chiefs to secure the coast and lines of communication around Beirut from Byzantine attack. Epistle 50, one of the Epistles of Wisdom composed by Druze missionaries in the early 11th century, was explicitly directed to three Tanukhid emirs settled in the mountainous Gharb area southeast of Beirut, calling on them to continue the tradition of their ancestors in spreading Druze teachings. The Gharb was less rugged than the neighboring areas to the north and south, and its strategic value stemmed from its control of Beirut's southern harbor and the road connecting Beirut with Damascus. The warrior peasants who inhabited the Gharb subscribed to the Druze faith, an esoteric offshoot of Isma'ilism, the religion of the Fatimid caliphs of Egypt (r. 973–1171). Shahid holds that the Tanukh entered the Gharb as Sunni Muslims and afterward became Druze. (Note: According to Firro, the Tanukh of northern Syia were influenced by Isma'ilism, a major branch of Shia Islam, as evidenced by "the strong Ismāʾīlī bias" of the 10th-century poet al-Ma'arri, who belonged to the tribe.) Their leaders in the Gharb may have received and embraced the Fatimid Isma'ili da'wa (mission) as early as the late 10th century.

When Beirut was captured by the Crusaders in 1110 after a three-month siege, its Muslim garrison and the Muslim tribal chiefs of the adjacent mountains who aided in its defense were massacred. The 19th-century history of Mount Lebanon's notable families by Tannus al-Shidyaq and the Sijill al-Arslani hold that the slain Tanukhids belonged to the tribe's Arslan line led by Adud al-Dawla Ali, who was killed alongside most of his family. An Arslan emir, Majd al-Dawla Muhammad, survived and abandoned Sidon to the Crusaders before retiring to the Gharb where he took over the lands of his deceased kinsmen, holding them until his death in battle in 1137.

The historian Kamal Salibi surmises that successive Muslim atabegs (Turkic rulers) of Damascus resettled Mount Lebanon with Arab tribesmen to buttress the frontier with the Crusader states; the most prominent of the settler families were the branch of the Tanukh led by Ali ibn al-Husayn. The early 15th-century chronicler Salih ibn Yahya, a member of the Buhturids, noted that Ali's grandfather was Abu Ishaq Ibrahim ibn Abi Abdallah, who was the commander of a place called 'al-Bira' in 1027. While Salibi identifies al-Bira with the fortified town of the same name on the Byzantine–Islamic frontier in Anatolia where Ibrahim's clansmen and descendants would have gained significant experience in frontier warfare, the historian Nejla Abu-Izzedin considers Salibi's theory incorrect and holds that al-Bira was the Gharb village of the same name mentioned in the Druzes' Epistle 48. Abu-Izzedin further notes that the 1061 entry of the Sijill al-Arslani records the name Abu Ishaq Ibrahim ibn Abdallah as one of the three Tanukhid emirs addressed in Epistle 50 and places his death in 1029. The historian William Harris questions Salibi's theory of the Buhturids' origins and considers it more probable that the family was already established in the Gharb and was at least distantly related to the Arslan Tanukhids who were slain in 1110, though the family may have been reinforced by Druze settlers from the northern Levant.

The Buhturids had been known as the 'Banu Abi Abdallah' after Ali ibn al-Husayn's great-grandfather. They became known as the 'Banu Buhtur' after the ascent of Ali ibn al-Husayn's son, Nahid al-Dawla Buhtur. Clans independent of the Buhturids were settled in neighboring districts, including the Banu Ma'n (Ma'nids), which was established in the Chouf immediately south of the Gharb in 1120 and established political and marital ties with the Buhturids, and the Banu Shihab, which was established in Wadi al-Taym between Mount Lebanon and the western countryside of Damascus in 1173.

== Emirate of the Gharb ==
=== Burid and Zengid periods ===
Nahid al-Dawla Buhtur was recognized as the emir of the Gharb in June 1147 by the last Burid atabeg of Damascus, Mujir al-Din Abaq. The latter's written declaration, as recorded verbatim by Ibn Yahya, is the earliest known text about the Buhturids. It acknowledged Buhtur's command of the Gharb, control of its villages, ownership of their revenues, and protection of its ru'asa (village chiefs) and peasants. It is probable that Buhtur was among the frontier commanders called by Abaq to help repulse a Crusader raid against Damascus in 1148, and his Druze warriors a component of the "many archers" who had come "from the direction of the Biqa' [Beqaa Valley] and from elsewhere" to defend the city during that battle referenced by the Damascene historian Ibn al-Qalanisi (d. 1160).

The Buhturids' principal local rival in the Gharb during the wars with the Crusaders were the Banu Sa'dan or Banu Abi al-Jaysh, a clan of the Bedouin Banu al-Hamra from the Beqaa Valley whose headquarters was in Aramoun. The Banu Abi al-Jaysh may have also been settled in the Gharb by the Burid atabegs or had entered the area on their own initiative, but in either case were also recognized as emirs of the area. The Buhturids were consistently the stronger clan, but their struggles with the Banu Abi al-Jaysh for supremacy in the Gharb recurred throughout the Crusader period and into the Mamluk era in Mount Lebanon. The Buhturids frequently maintained profitable accommodations with the Crusader lords of Beirut and the nearby coastal town of Sidon to the south, who "were always willing to pay well for Buhturid good will", according to Salibi. At the same time, the emirs were careful to demonstrate their protection of the frontier with religious zeal to maintain financial support and avoid attacks from the Muslim rulers of Damascus.

Map of medieval Levant. The Buhturids helped guard the Islamic frontier from the lords of Beirut, though they maintained a degree of relations in peacetime

After the capture of Burid Damascus by Nur al-Din, the Zengid atabeg of Aleppo in 1154, and the resulting unification of the Islamic Levant under his leadership, the Buhturid emir Zahr al-Din Karama abandoned any arrangements that had possibly been made with the Crusaders and offered his services to Nur al-Din. The latter, in turn, recognized Karama as emir of the Gharb in 1157, and granted him control over most of its villages and other villages in southern Mount Lebanon, the Beqaa Valley, and Wadi al-Taym in the form of an iqta, as well as the provision of forty horsemen from Damascus and whatever taxes he could levy in time of war. As a result of his support by Nur al-Din, Karama established headquarters in the Gharb fortress of Sarhammur (modern Sarhmoul), from which he harried the Crusaders along the coast. Karama's close proximity to Beirut disturbed its lords from the Brisebarre family and a series of raids and counter-raids between them and Karama lasted until 1166 following Gautier III of Brisebarre's sale of the fief of Beirut to the king of Jerusalem. Tensions between Beirut and the Buhturids continued until Karama's death and the subsequent killing of his three eldest sons, both occurring sometime before 1170. Ibn Yahya holds that the sons had been lured to a wedding by the lord of Beirut where they were executed.

The deaths of Karama, his sons and the subsequent assault on Sarhammur by the Crusaders nearly marked the end of the Buhturids. Karama's youngest son, Jamal al-Din Hajji, was a young boy and escaped Sarhammur with his mother, relocating to the Gharb village of Tirdala, where Nur al-Din bestowed on him a small iqta in compensation for his father's and brothers' deaths. Hajji's paternal uncle, Sharaf al-Dawla Ali, also survived the Crusader assault and reestablished himself in Aramoun where he founded a cadet branch of the Buhturids.

=== Ayyubid period ===
Nur al-Din died in 1174 and his former dependent, Saladin, founded the Ayyubid Sultanate, which spanned Egypt and much of the Islamic Levant by 1182. On 6 August 1187, Saladin conquered Beirut. On his approach to the town, he was welcomed by Hajji at the coastal village of Khalde. Upon his capture of Beirut, Saladin summoned Hajji, declared that he avenged his family's losses, and confirmed his emirate in the Gharb. Seven villages were attached to Hajji's iqta and recognized as property inherited by his father and grandfather. Saladin's son and successor in Damascus, al-Afdal, was ousted by Saladin's brother, al-Adil of Egypt, in 1196 and exiled to Salkhad, from which he solicited the assistance of Hajji and the Buhturids in retaking the sultanate. It is not known if Hajji responded to al-Afdal.

The Crusaders recaptured Beirut in 1197 and its new lords from the House of Ibelin were more aggressive than the Brisebarres' in asserting their influence in Beirut's countryside. Hajji did not fare well during their lordship and may have refused to reach accommodations with them in light of the Crusaders' killing of his family and destruction of Sarhmoul. In 1222 he received confirmation of his iqta from the Ayyubid emir of Damascus, al-Mu'azzam Isa, to whom Hajji complained at one point about his maltreatment at the hands of the Ibelins. The year of Hajji's death is not known, though his son and successor, Najm al-Din Muhammad, and another of his sons, Sharaf al-Din Ali, were slain in battle on 3 October 1242 in the Keserwan, north of Beirut, by the Crusaders or their local allies. Before his death, Muhammad's support was sought by the Ayyubid sultan of Egypt, al-Salih Ayyub, in the latter's bid to gain control of Damascus from his uncle, al-Salih Isma'il, though it is not known if Muhammad obliged. The Ayyubids of Damascus had conceded the Gharb and the nearby Chouf to the Crusaders in a treaty in 1240.

=== Mamluk period ===
==== Vacillations between the Mamluks, Crusaders, Mongols and Ayyubids ====
The Buhturid emirate in the Gharb passed to Muhammad's sons Jamal al-Din Hajji II (d. 1298) and Sa'd al-Din Khidr (d. 1314) and their father's cousin, Zayn al-Din Salih (d. 1296). Their leadership coincided with a particularly turbulent period in the Levant: the Crusaders had regained control of the Levantine coastlands amid Ayyubid infighting, the Mamluks had toppled the Ayyubids of Egypt in 1250 and moved to wrest control of Ayyubid emirates in the Levant, while the Mongols conquered and destroyed the Abbasid Caliphate in Iraq in 1258 and afterward invaded the Levant. According to Salibi, the unstable political circumstances of the region left the Buhturids to "have a foot in every camp and thus ingratiate all the parties concerned". To that end, the family maintained cordial ties with the Crusader lords of Beirut and Sidon, declared their loyalty to the Ayyubid emirs, attempted negotiations with the Mamluks of Egypt, and pondered accommodating the Mongols. Ibn Yahya records and dates letters recognizing Buhturid leadership of the Gharb from the Ayyubid emir of Damascus al-Nasir Yusuf, the Mamluk sultan Aybak, the Mongol ruler Hulagu, and the lords of Beirut and Sidon.

In 1255, al-Nasir Yusuf sent a punitive expedition against the Buhturids of Gharb as a result of their duplicity. His army's regular troops and allied tribesmen from Baalbek and the Beqaa Valley were routed by the Buhturids at the village of Aytat, close to modern Aley. The following year, the lord of Sidon granted Hajji II agricultural land in Damour south of Beirut, likely in compensation for services to Sidon. In 1259 Hajji II and Salih submitted to the Mongol general Kitbuqa, who recognized their holdings in the Gharb. Upon hearing of the Mamluk sultan Qutuz's campaign into Syria the two Buhturid emirs agreed that Salih would join the Egyptian camp, while Hajji II would remain with the Mongols and whichever emir was on the winning side would intercede on behalf of the other. Salih fought reputably with the Mamluks when they routed the Mongols at the Battle of Ain Jalut in Palestine and was pardoned by Qutuz for his initial allegiance to Kitbuqa.

In the early decades of Mamluk rule, while the Crusaders continued to control the coastlands, the Mamluk government remained suspicious of Buhturid loyalties. The Buhturid emirs maintained an outward appearance as Sunni Muslims and were accepted as such by the Mamluks. Qutuz's successor, Baybars, confirmed their iqtas in the Gharb and employed them as auxiliaries in his engagements against the Crusaders and as intelligence gatherers. Baybars imprisoned Hajji II, Salih and Khidr for alleged collaboration with the Crusader Count of Tripoli between 1268 and 1270, but they were released by Baybars's successor, his son Baraka Khan, in 1278. Buhturid relations with Beirut were not abandoned, and in 1280 the lord of Beirut, Humphrey of Montfort, granted Salih lands near Choueifat in exchange for extraditing fugitives from Beirut who took shelter in the Gharb and protecting Beirut from attacks by the Gharb's inhabitants.

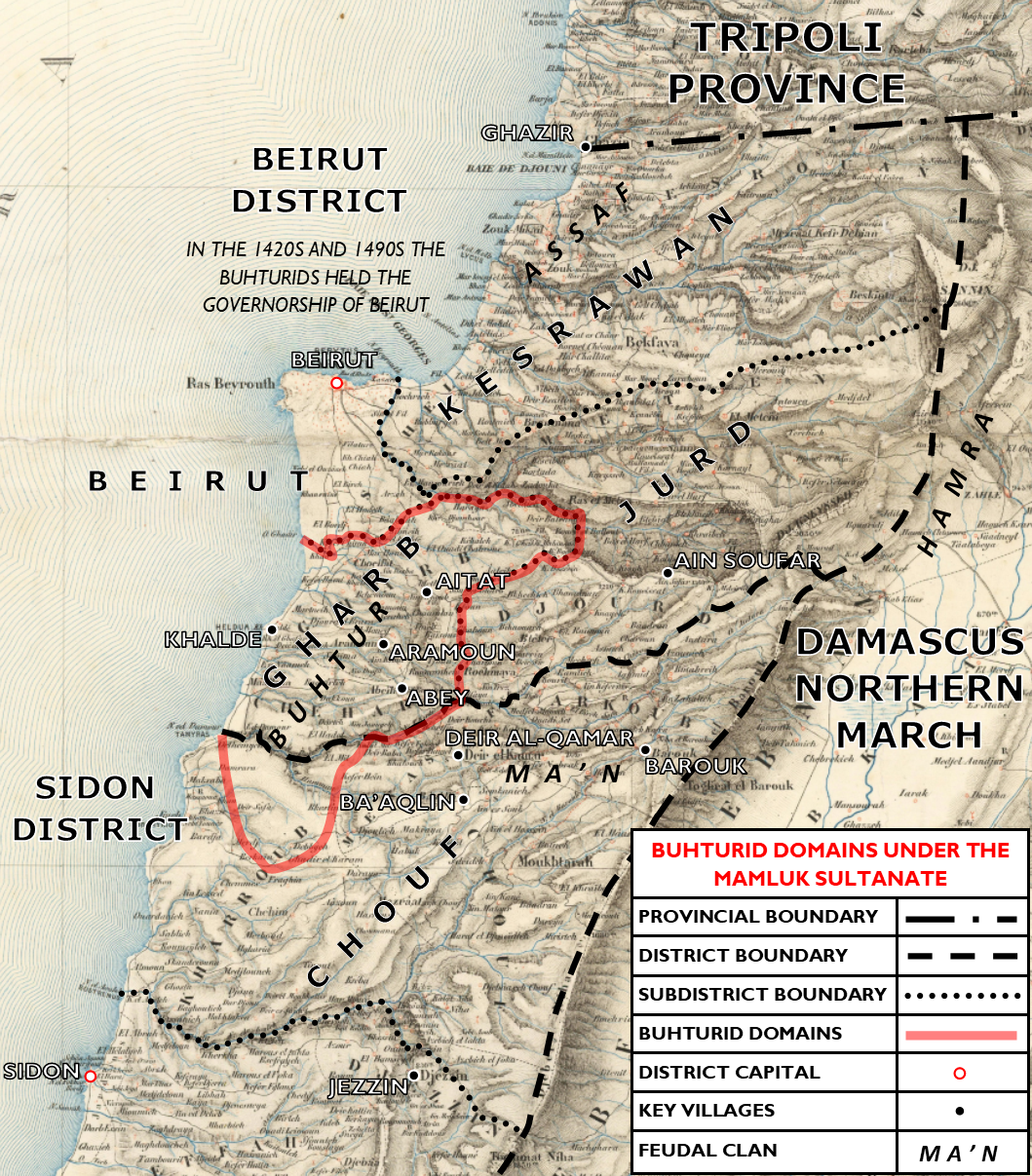
Map of the Buhturid domains in Mount Lebanon under Mamluk rule

==== Incorporation into the halqa ====
Sultan Qalawun (r. 1279–1290) confiscated the Buhturids' iqtas, along with the iqtas of other local chiefs in the coastal mountains, in 1288. After conquering the County of Tripoli the following year, Qalawun designated these as an income reserve for the halqa (free, non-mamluk cavalries) garrisoned in Tripoli. Khidr, the main Buhturid chief at the time, passed leadership over to his son, Nasir al-Din Husayn. Qalawun's successor, his son al-Ashraf Khalil, conquered the remaining Crusader holdouts along the coast, including Beirut and Sidon, in 1291. He balanced his father's centralization drive with the realization that the militarily experienced peasant warriors of the Gharb and the other mountain frontier districts, who formed a key component of the Muslims' coastal defenses, were only effective under their traditional chiefs. Al-Ashraf Khalil's solution was the restoration of the Buhturids to part of their former iqtas and their incorporation into the halqa in 1292. Al-Ashraf Khalil's successor, al-Nasir Muhammad, restored the balance of the Buhturids' former iqtas to the family in 1294. Five years later, the Buhturids gave refuge to Mamluk troops fleeing the Mongol advance after the Mamluk defeat at the Battle of Wadi al-Khaznadar near Homs, in contrast to the local attacks the Mamluks encountered as they crossed the Keserwan.

The Buhturid emirs were assigned a rank and given command over a number of mamluk troops, depending on the emir's rank. Husayn was made emir of three while his cousin, Salih's grandson Shams al-Din Karama ibn Buhtur, was made emir of ten. In 1305 Husayn and his cousins Muhammad and Ahmad, both sons of Hajji II, participated in the government campaigns in the Keserwan against Druze, Alawite, Shia Muslim, and Maronite rebels. The deaths of Muhammad and Ahmad during the campaign strengthened Husayn's leadership position. The following year, the family's emirs were officially charged with protecting the harbor of Beirut, notifying the authorities of naval raids from Cyprus, and assisting the government in repulsing naval raids. Turkmen settlers were stationed in the Keserwan and militarily coordinated with the Buhturids. The Buhturids were assisted and overseen by rotational halqa units from Baalbek, the administrative capital of the Northern March of Damascus Province, to which the Beirut District was subordinate. After Karama ibn Buhtur's death in 1307, Husayn obtained his rank and iqta.

The Buhturids lost their iqtas in the 1313 cadastral survey of the Levant ordered by al-Nasir Muhammad. Iqtas were redistributed throughout the region, with holders being reassigned smaller iqtas in line with their rank and often in areas far from their abodes. Husayn lobbied Emir Tankiz, the Mamluk viceroy of Damascus, to restore the family to their iqtas in Mount Lebanon lest the troops in their district "shall perish, for it is their home and that of their men and clan, and they can benefit of no other property". The Mamluks agreed to leave the Buhturid iqtas intact, thereby formalizing a hereditary system of feudal land tenure which had become traditional in southern Mount Lebanon. Husayn was promoted to emir of twenty in 1314, but his iqta was not increased. Between 1306 and his retirement in 1348 Husayn helped repulse several Cypriot and Genoese raids against Beirut and in 1343 participated in an expedition against the deposed Mamluk sultan al-Nasir Ahmad in al-Karak.

Husayn was succeeded by his son Zayn al-Din Salih II (d. 1377). In 1373 Salih II passed leadership of the Buhturids to his sons Shihab al-Din Ahmad (d. 1382) and Sayf al-Din Yahya (d. 1388), who ruled jointly. The former successfully ignored a Mamluk order to cut down the plums trees of the Chouf to make arrows, saving the Druze peasants of agricultural losses and forced labor; it contributed to the Bunturids' respect among the local population. Their successors mostly did not attain the prominence of the earlier Buhturids, though this may have been associated with the general decline and political instability of the Mamluk realm following the death of al-Nasir Muhammad in 1343. Yahya entered into conflict with the Mamluk viceroy of Damascus after the latter accused him of incompetence in repulsing a Genoese raid on Beirut in 1382 and demonstrating sympathies for local Shias in a dispute with Sunnis in Beirut.

==== Peak of power and decline ====
During the transition in the Mamluk Sultanate from the Turkish sultans to the Circassian sultans under Sultan Barquq in 1382, the Buhturids threw in their lot with the latter. The Turkish government was restored in 1389, during which Barquq, supported by various Syrian emirs, including the Buhturids, besieged Damascus. The Turkmens of Keserwan, who supported the Turkish sultans, used the opportunity to raid the hills around Beirut, exterminating the Abi al-Jaysh emirs and attacking the Arslans. They proceeded to raid the Buhturids in the Gharb following Barquq's reinstatement in 1390, but were unable to capture their strongholds of Ainab and Aramoun. Barquq sent against the Turkmens the Buhturids, Bedouin tribesmen from the Beqaa Valley and regular Mamluk troops, who routed them. Nonetheless, Barquq did not expand the domains of his Buhturid allies and kept the Turkmens in place in the Keserwan, possibly to avoid affording too much local power to the Buhturids or prevent their forces from being strained.

The Buhturids grew their commercial enterprises, exporting silk, olive oil and soap from Beirut and forming business ties with Mamluk officials in Egypt. They reached the peak of their power during the sultanate of Barsbay (1422–1438). The sultan appointed the Buhturid emir Izz al-Din Sadaqa the mutawali (governor) of Beirut, the first member of the family to attain the post, while Ibn Yahya was promoted to the rank of amir ashrin (commander of twenty mamluks). Ibn Yahya and an emir from the rival Banu al-Hamra participated in a naval expedition against Cyprus in 1425, after which the Banu al-Hamra emir was awarded property in Beirut by Barsbay; when the emir was assassinated by a Mamluk officer, Ibn Yahya was granted the property. The Banu al-Hamra responded by assaulting the Buhturids' residence in Beirut and planning an ambush against Ibn Yahya in the Beqaa Valley. The plot was foiled and the chief of the Banu al-Hamra was arrested and executed by the viceroy of Damascus.

In 1496 the paramount Buhturid emir Jamal al-Din Hajji persuaded the governor of Damascus to dismiss the Bedouin Bani al-Hansh emir Nasir al-Din Muhammad from the governorship of Beirut. Jamal al-Din was appointed in his place. Nasir al-Din Muhammad revolted in 1505 and raided Beirut, destroying Jamal al-Din's soap warehouses. The Ma'n under Emir Fakhr al-Din Uthman supported Nasir al-Din against the Buhturids. The Mamluks reinstated Nasir al-Din to Beirut in 1512. The growing influence of the Ma'ns under Fakhr al-Din Uthman came at the expense of the Buhturids' preeminence among the Druze of Mount Lebanon.

== Ottoman period ==
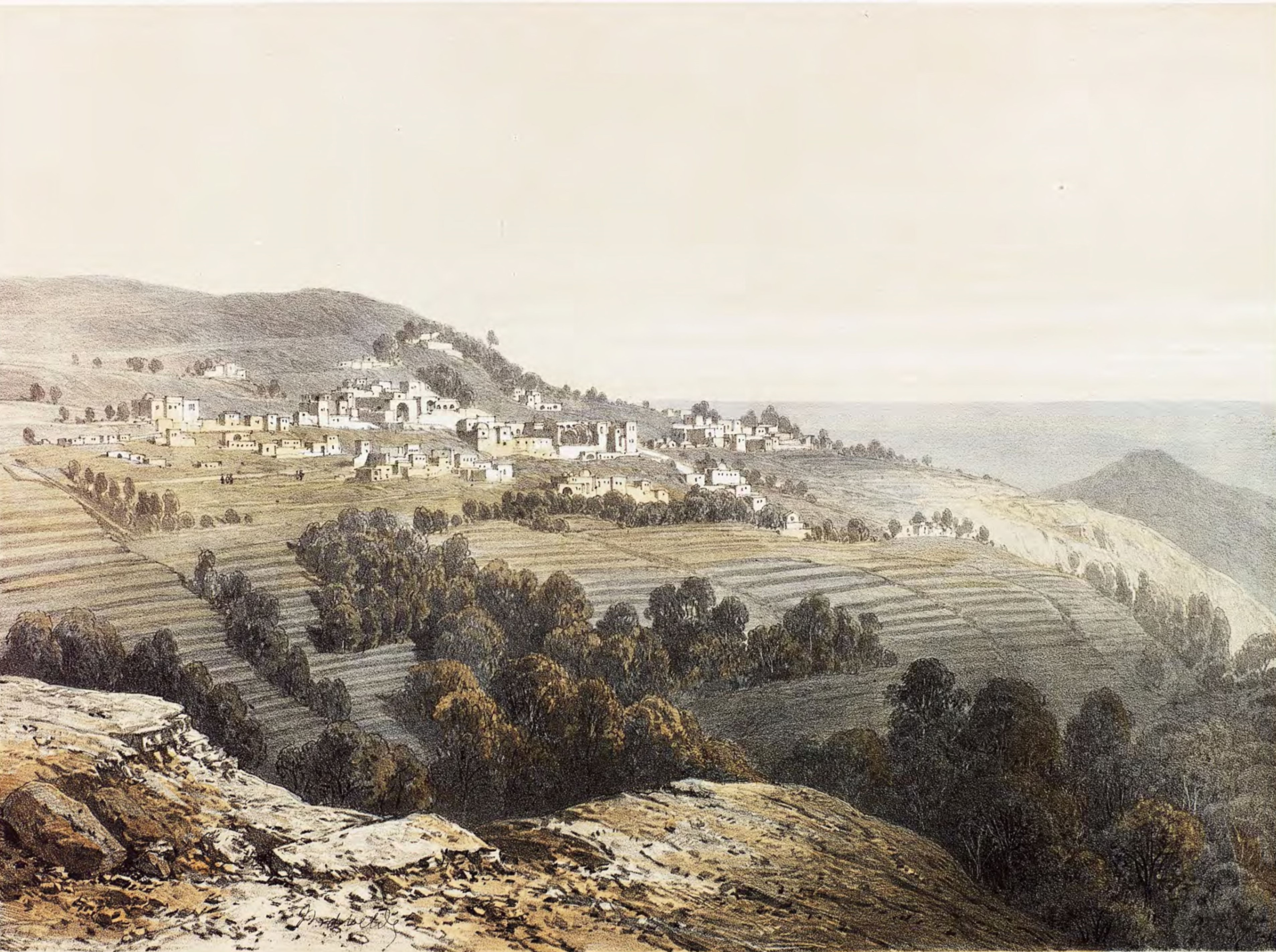
Abeih (sketched in 1857), one of the headquarter villages of the Buhturids in the Gharb

At the time of the Ottoman conquest of the Levant in 1516, the preeminent leader of the Buhturids was Sharaf al-Din Yahya, who gave homage to the Ottoman sultan Selim I in Damascus in 1516 and 1517. On the first occasion, the sultan confirmed the Buhturid iqtas in the Gharb. The Gharb-based Druze historian Ibn Sibat (d. 1520) records Yahya as the sole Druze chief to have welcomed Selim in Damascus, contrary to the chronicle of Duwayhi who lists the chiefs of the Ma'n as also having welcomed Selim, which Salibi considers doubtful. In 1518, Yahya was imprisoned by the governor of Damascus, Janbirdi al-Ghazali, for allegedly supporting the revolt of Nasir al-Din Muhammad of the Bani al-Hansh against Selim. They were transferred to Selim's custody in Aleppo and were then released after being reprimanded by the sultan. The following year Jamal al-Din Hajji was imprisoned in Damascus by Janbirdi's deputy and was never heard from again.

The Buhturid emirs of the Gharb were granted by the Ottomans iltizam (limited-term tax farms) in the Gharb and Beirut and neighboring subdistricts. Jamal al-Din's son Sharaf al-Din Ali and the latter's son Muhammad together held the tax farms of the Gharb in 1562–1565 and 1566–1569, the Keserwan with the Assafs in 1565–1568, much of Beirut with the Assafs in 1566–1570, and the salt revenues from the ports of Beirut, Sidon and Acre with their Buhturid kinsman Nasir al-Din Muhammad ibn Sayf al-Din Abu Bakr in 1568–1569. Sharaf al-Din Ali and Muhammad were also recorded as timar (land grant) holders in the Gharb in 1569, grants which were reconfirmed in 1576. Sharif al-Din Ali may have avoided a potential trap to kill him by avoiding summons from the governor of Damascus in 1568; the emir of the Banu al-Hanash was executed in Damascus after responding to the same summons. The Ottoman imperial government issued orders to the governor of Damascus to confiscate Sharaf al-Din Ali's rifles, and those of the Assafs, Ma'ns, and Sawwaf in 1572.

=== Under Ma'nid ascendance ===
The Ottomans launched a punitive campaign against the Druze Mountain in 1585. Sharaf al-Din Ali's son Muhammad and the Buhturid emir Mundhir of Abeih in the Gharb, the grandson of Nasir al-Din Muhammad, were captured by the Ottoman vizier Ibrahim Pasha and imprisoned in Constantinople for a short period. The following year Muhammad had his iltizam in the Gharb reinstated. The campaign's main target, the Ma'nid emir Qurqumaz, died in hiding in 1586. His son Fakhr al-Din II, whose mother Sitt Nasab was Mundhir's sister, succeeded him as chief of the Chouf in c. 1590. He had been protected during the preceding six years by his uncle, Mundhir's brother Sayf al-Din. Fakhr al-Din was appointed over the tax farms of the Chouf, the Gharb and most of the Druze Mountain, along with Beirut and Sidon through the 1590s. In 1593 he was made governor of the Sidon-Beirut Sanjak. That year Muhammad led a raid against the Beqaa Valley with the Sawwaf and Abu al-Lama families of the Matn.

As Fakhr al-Din's power in Syria grew, he was considered as a threat by the Ottoman authorities in Damascus and Constantinople and was targeted in an expedition led by the Damascus governor Hafiz Ahmed Pasha in 1613. Muhammad's son Hasan at the time shared the tax farm of the subdistricts of southern Mount Lebanon with the Sayfa and Alam al-Din families of Akkar and the Matn, respectively. His brother Sharaf al-Din was killed by Hafiz Ahmed Pasha's troops in a village near Jezzine in 1614. Fakhr al-Din, meanwhile, had escaped to Europe leaving his brother Yunus and son Ali in charge of the Ma'n's collapsing domains. They were reappointed over Sidon-Beirut Sanjak in 1615 and afterward installed their Buhturid allies Mundhir over the tax farm of Beirut and his nephew Nasir al-Din (likely Sayf al-Din's son) over the Gharb and the Jurd. Three years later Mundhir and Nasir al-Din had a dispute with Ali over Mundhir's former residence in Beirut, but the matter was dropped when Fakhr al-Din II returned from exile. Nasir al-Din's son later had a dispute with Ali Ma'n over the tax farm of the Gharb in 1622 and temporarily gained refuge in Nablus.

In 1633 Fakhr al-Din was captured and imprisoned by the Ottomans, who appointed in his place over the Chouf Ali Alam al-Din. That year Alam al-Din moved against Fakhr al-Din's supporters and family. He massacred the entire Buhturid family in a surprise attack during a meeting with the family's leaders in their headquarters at Abeih. Duwayhi details Alam al-Din's slaying of the preeminent Buhturid chief Yahya al-Aqil, the lesser chiefs Mahmud, Nasir al-Din and Sayf al-Din (Nasir al-Din's son), followed by the killing of their three young sons in a nearby tower, "leaving no child to succeed them". Harris called the elimination of the Buhturid family the "extinguishing [of] an illustrious name in Lebanon's medieval history."

== Assessment ==
The Buhturids maintained a significant degree of local autonomy in Mount Lebanon for nearly four hundred years preceding Ottoman rule. Their rule set the stage for Ma'nid dominance of Mount Lebanon and its environs in the 16th and 17th centuries. According to Salibi, the Buhturids' staying power made Mount Lebanon "essentially different from other regions in Syria", their preservation "in southern [Mount] Lebanon [of] a hereditary feudal system ... was to serve later as the basis of Lebanese autonomy under the Ottomans".

== Bibliography ==
- Abu-Husayn, Abdul-Rahim (1985). Provincial Leaderships in Syria, 1575–1650. Beirut: American University of Beirut. ISBN 9780815660729. OCLC 242675094.
- Abu-Izzedin, Nejla M. (1993) [1984]. The Druzes: A New Study of Their History, Faith, and Society (2nd ed.). Leiden and New York: Brill. ISBN 90-04-09705-8.
- Firro, Kais (1992). A History of the Druzes. Vol. 1. Brill. ISBN 9004094377.
- Harris, William (2012). Lebanon: A History, 600–2011. New York: Oxford University Press. ISBN 978-0-19-518-111-1.
- Hourani, Alexander (2010). New Documents on the History of Mount Lebanon and Arabistan in the 10th and 11th Centuries H. Beirut.
- Salibi, Kamal S. (January 1961). "The Buḥturids of the Garb. Mediaeval Lords of Beirut and of Southern Lebanon". Arabica. 8 (1): 74–97. doi:10.1163/157005861X00043. JSTOR 4054971.
- Salibi, Kamal (June 1967). "Northern Lebanon under the Dominance of Ġazīr (1517–1591)". Arabica. 14 (2): 144–166. doi:10.1163/157005867X00029. JSTOR 4055631.
- Salibi, Kamal S. (July 1973). "The Secret of the House of Ma'n". International Journal of Middle East Studies. 4 (3): 272–287. doi:10.1017/S0020743800031469. JSTOR 162160. S2CID 163020137.
- Shahid, I. (2000). "Tanūkh". In Bearman, P. J.; Bianquis, Th.; Bosworth, C. E.; van Donzel, E. & Heinrichs, W. P. (eds.). The Encyclopaedia of Islam, Second Edition. Volume X: T–U. Leiden: E. J. Brill. pp. 190–192. ISBN 978-90-04-11211-7.
