= Kisrawan campaigns (1292–1305) =

Series of Mamluk military expeditions

Coordinates: 34°06′N 35°48′E

Date	1292, 1300 and 1305
Location	The Kisrawan region of Mount Lebanon
Result	Mamluk victory

Belligerents
Mamluk Sultanate; Buhturids	Shia, Alawite, Druze and Maronite mountaineers of Kisrawan

Commanders and leaders
Badr al-Din Baydara; Aqqush al-Afram; Nasir al-Din Husayn ibn Khidr; Najm al-Din Muhammad ibn Hajji †; Ahmad ibn Hajji †	Chiefs of Banu al-Awd; Chiefs of Abu al-Lama; Khalid of Mishmish; Sinan of Aylij; Sulayman of Aylij; Sa'ada of Lehfed; Sarkis of Lehfed; Antar of Aqoura; Benjamin of Hardine †

Strength
50,000	40,000

Casualties and losses
Hundreds killed	Thousands killed; Hundreds captured
- Mass killings and expulsions of Kisrawanis. Destruction of several villages, churches, monasteries, and vineyards.
- Location of the Kisrawan in modern Lebanon

The Kisrawan campaigns were a series of Mamluk military expeditions against the mountaineers of the Kisrawan, as well as the neighboring areas of Byblos and the Jurd, in Mount Lebanon. The offensives were launched in 1292, 1300 and 1305. The mountaineers were Shia Muslim, Alawite, Maronite and Druze tribesmen who historically acted autonomously of any central authority. The Maronites in particular had maintained close cooperation with the last Crusader state, the County of Tripoli. After the fall of Tripoli to the Mamluks in 1289, the mountaineers would often block the coastal road between Tripoli and Beirut, prompting the first Mamluk expedition in 1292 under the viceroy of Egypt, Baydara. During that campaign, the Mamluks, spread along the coastal road and cut off from each other at various points, were constantly harried by the mountaineers, who confiscated their weapons, horses and money. Baydara withdrew his men only after paying off the mountain chiefs.

The second campaign was launched in 1300 to punish the mountaineers for attacking and robbing Mamluk troops retreating along the coastal road following their rout by the Ilkhanate at the Battle of Wadi al-Khaznadar the year before. The viceroy of Damascus, Aqqush al-Afram, defeated the Kisrawani fighters in a number of engagements, after which they conceded, handed over the weapons they had confiscated in 1292 and paid a heavy fine. Persistent rebellion by the mountaineers led Aqqush to lead a final punitive campaign against the Kisrawan in 1305, which caused mass destruction of villages and the killings and mass displacement of its inhabitants.

After the final expedition, the Mamluks settled Turkmen tribesmen in the coastal parts of the Kisrawan to keep a permanent, direct presence in the region. The Alawites fared particularly badly, and were no longer mentioned inhabiting the Kisrawan in the historical record. The Twelver Shia remained the largest confessional group, but their numbers never recovered. While the Maronites were also dealt heavy human and material losses, they were not the principal targets of the campaign. During early Ottoman rule (1516–1917), Maronites became the predominant religious group in the Kisrawan due to migration there from northern Mount Lebanon. Their settlement was patronized by the Turkmen Assaf governors of the region.

In modern Lebanese historical narratives, the Kisrawan campaigns have been a source of controversy by historians from different religious groups. Maronite, Shia and Druze historians have each sought to emphasize the roles of their respective confessional group, over each other, in defending the autonomy of the Kisrawan from Mamluk outsiders. In writings by Sunni Muslim authors, the Mamluks are portrayed as the legitimate Muslim state working to incorporate Mount Lebanon into the rest of the Islamic realm.

== Background ==
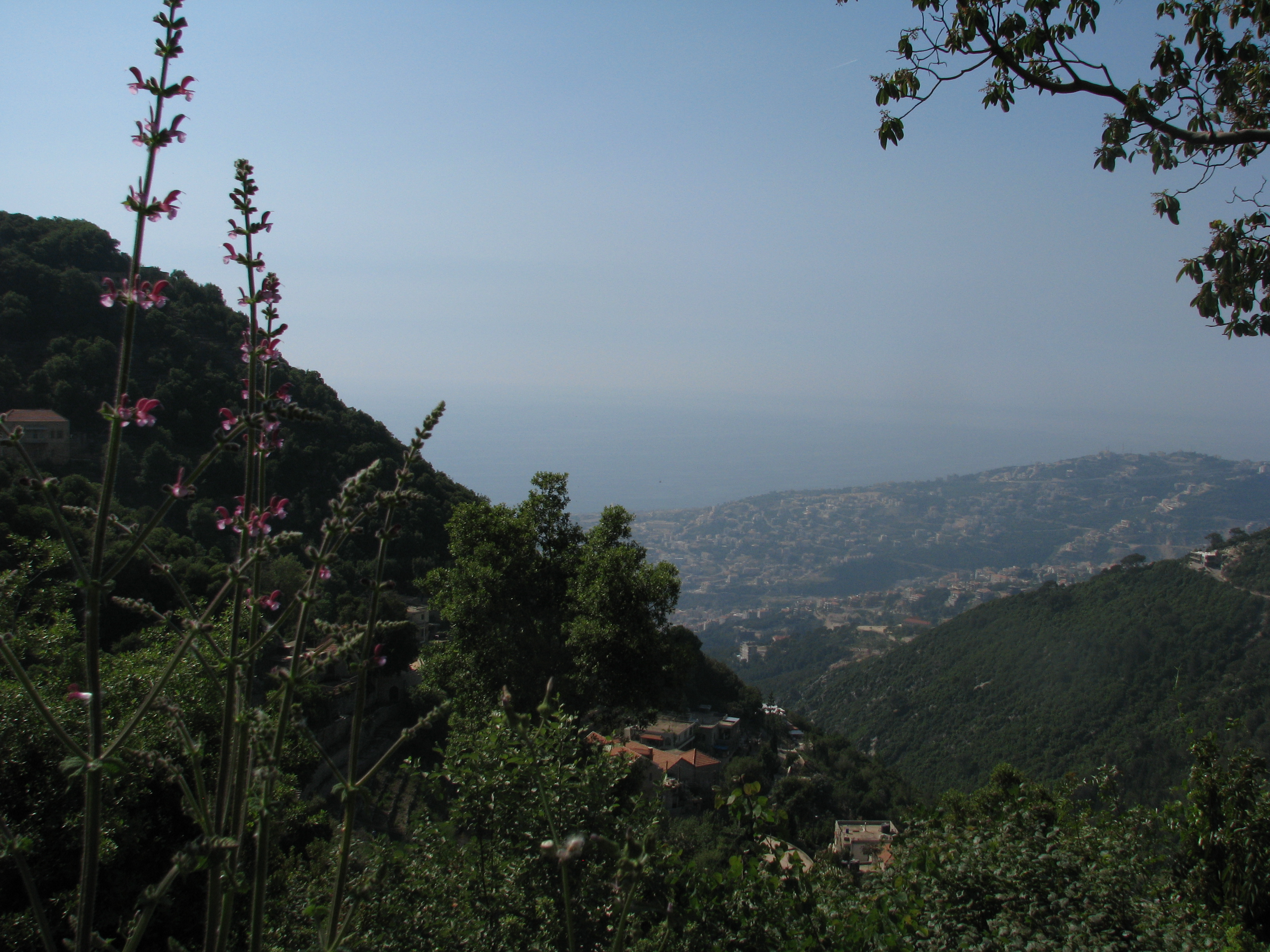
A hillside in the Kisrawan area of Mount Lebanon

The Kisrawan is the area of Mount Lebanon extending from Beirut in the south to the Ibrahim River (Nahr Ibrahim) in the north. In the 12th century it had a tribal and religiously mixed population of Maronite Christians, Twelver Shia Muslims, Alawites and Druze.

Information about the Christians of the Kisrawan before the 12th century is scant, though in the 9th century there was evidently an organized Christian, likely Maronite, community governed by village headmen. The Christians of Mount Lebanon had been tolerated under the Levant-based Umayyad caliphs (660–750), but became a source of suspicion to the Iraq-based Abbasid caliphs, who toppled the Umayyads in 750. The distance of Mount Lebanon from the central government and renewed assaults by the Byzantines, viewed as natural allies of the Christians, contributed to Abbasid anxieties. In response, the Abbasids installed Muslim emirs from the Tanukh tribe in the hills around Beirut, south of the Kisrawan, to strengthen their authority in the region in the mid-8th century. Under Muslim rule, Christians were mandated to pay the jizya, a form of poll tax, though its actual collection in Mount Lebanon was likely done on an inconsistent basis. In response to an Abbasid tax levy in 759, the Christians in the Munaytara region immediately north of the Kisrawan revolted against the government, in coordination with the Byzantines. It was severely suppressed by the Abbasids with heavy rebel casualties and large-scale deportations. A number of the deportees were allowed to return after the intervention of the Muslim theologian Abd al-Rahman al-Awza'i of Beirut. Further tax rebellions by Christians, presumably inspired by Byzantine military gains against the Caliphate, occurred in 791 and 845.

From 860, Mount Lebanon and the Levant in general no longer came under direct Abbasid rule except for a short revival in the 10th century. Instead, a host of Muslim rulerships prevailed in all or part of the Levant, including the Sunni Muslim Tulunids and Ikshidids in the late 9th–early 10th centuries, followed by the Twelver Shia Hamdanids and Ismaili Shia Fatimids in the late 10th–early 11th centuries. Twelver Shias were well established in close-by Tripoli by the late 10th century. Twelver communities may have been established in the Kisrawan and the bordering Byblos area to the north during the same time period, though Shia-leaning Muslims may have been present as early as the Umayyad period or entered following the deportations of Christians in 759. According to the historian Ja'far al-Muhajir, pro-Alid and Shia-leaning Muslims, represented by the tribes of Hamdan and Madh'hij in local tradition, could have settled in nearby Dinniyeh to the north after the Hasan–Muawiya treaty in 661. The Druze religion, which branched off of Isma'ili Shia Islam in the early 11th century, gained adherents among people in Mount Lebanon and its environs, including much of the Tanukh settlers in the hills east of Beirut. Certain aspects of the faith, such as transmigration of souls between adherents, were viewed as heretical and foreign by Sunni and Shia Muslims, but contributed to solidarity among the Druze, who closed their religion to new converts in 1046 due to the threat of persecution.

The regional order changed with the conquest of the interior regions of the Levant by the Sunni Muslim Seljuks in 1071. The emirate of Tripoli along the coast adjacent to Mount Lebanon, ruled by a family of Twelver Shia jurists since 1065, and the Tanukhs, maintained their autonomy amid Seljuk internal squabbles. The Fatimids resumed control of Byblos and other coastal cities before the end of the century, but Tripoli remained independent. In 1109, the Latin Christian Crusaders, having already captured Palestine to the south and the north Levantine coast, conquered Tripoli, a process they had started from 1102. Northern Mount Lebanon thereafter became part of the County of Tripoli.

The Maronites of the Kisrawan maintained close relations and cooperated with the Crusaders, who abolished the jizya. Maronite mountaineers had lent their support to the siege of Tripoli. The Shia communities may also have been on better terms with the Crusaders than with the Sunni Muslim rulers of Damascus, or at least were not enthusiastic supporters of their cause against the Crusaders. The historian William Harris asserts that the origins of the Kisrawan Shia community in the 12th–13th centuries "are shrouded in mystery, with no clues in Arabic chronicles". However, according to al-Muhajir, the Twelvers of Kisrawan were likely remnants of the Shias of Tripoli who relocated to the Kisrawan during or after the Crusader siege of Tripoli. Ibn al-Athir relates that Tripoli was heavily pillaged, many of the inhabitants were killed and their treasures were seized, and many others fled to different places to avoid the Crusaders' attacks. The mountaineers of the Kisrawan, regardless of religious confession, did not recognize the authority of either the Crusader states or Damascus, and their territory remained outside of either's control.

In 1187–1188, Beirut and Byblos fell to Saladin, founder of the Sunni Ayyubid dynasty, but the cities reverted to Crusader possession in 1197. In 1266–1268 and 1283, the Sunni Mamluks, who had succeeded the Ayyubids in Islamic Syria in 1260, raided the Maronite countryside of Tripoli, namely the mountains of Bsharri and Byblos, both north of the Kisrawan. Several villages were plundered and their inhabitants killed. The Mamluk sultan Qalawun (r. 1271–1290) likely intended to suppress the potential resistance of the Maronite mountaineers of Tripoli's hinterland in preparation of his planned siege of the city. Tripoli was captured in 1289 and the last Crusader outposts along the coast fell within the next three years. The Mamluks reinstated the jizya obligations.

After the conquest, the Kisrawan remained a "lawless terrain" between the Mamluk provincial capitals of Damascus and Tripoli, according to Harris. The new rulers remained on guard for potential seaborne Crusader assaults on the Levantine coast in the west and joint military offensives with the Mongols, who were established north and east of the Mamluk empire. While the mostly Christian or non-Sunni Muslim-populated mountain regions between the coast and the interior plains of the Levant were not treated with suspicion as potential Crusader allies by the Mamluks, the Kisrawan's inhabitants were viewed differently. The Druze in the hills south and east of Beirut allied with the Mamluks. Neither the Twelver Shia of Jabal Amil further south nor the Alawites in the hills east of Latakia in the north lived within the strategic Damascus–Tripoli–Beirut corridors. The Maronites in northern Mount Lebanon had already been pacified by the Mamluks. All of these mountain communities had opposed the Crusaders at point or another, while the non-Sunni and Maronite mountaineers of the Kisrawan had never been in conflict with them. According to Harris, the "anomaly" that the Kisrawan presented with regard to its strategic location and historically Crusader-friendly population, "predisposed the Mamluks to military action".

== 1292 campaign ==
Following the withdrawal of the Crusaders, the Mamluks launched a punitive expedition against the mountaineers of the Kisrawan and the landlocked Jurd area immediately to its south in July 1292. The medieval Muslim historians identify the mountaineers as Twelver Shia, Alawites and Druze, though the late 15th-century Maronite historian Gabriel ibn al-Qilai mentions only Maronites. The Mamluk chronicle of Badr al-Din al-Ayni (d. 1453) is considered "the best account" of the campaign by Harris. Al-Ayni held that Sultan al-Ashraf Khalil (r. 1290–1293) ordered the operation in response to the mountaineers' blockading of the coastal road between Beirut and the Kisrawan. The Mamluk commanders in Damascus, to whom the task was charged, were wary of combating large numbers of battle-hardened mountaineers in the narrow passes of the Kisrawan.

In response to Damascene reticence, the sultan commissioned his Egypt-based viceroy Badr al-Din Baydara, who led a 3,000-strong army northward through the Levantine coast until reaching the Kisrawan. The mountain warriors who met the Mamluk cavalries numbered around 10,000. Upon the Mamluks' arrival, Maronite villagers rang their church bells to alert their muqaddams ("chiefs"), who met and drafted attack plans. Accordingly, men were stationed at the river gorges of Nahr al-Fidar and Nahr al-Madfoun, the southern and northern natural boundaries of the Byblos area immediately north of the Kisrawan.

The Mamluk force likely became divided across different points along the coastal road of the Kisrawan and Byblos and the valley tracks deeper into the mountains. They were harried by the mountaineers, though Ibn al-Qilai narrates a wider-scale assault against them by Maronite fighters. Mamluk reinforcements entering the Byblos mountains from the south were driven back by the mountaineers stationed at Nahr al-Fidar. Those who fled north were confronted by mountaineers stationed at Nahr al-Madfun. There, the rebels confiscated their arms, horses and goods. Afterward, the chiefs met at the Byblos village of Ma'd where the booty was divided. One Maronite muqaddam, Benjamin of Hardine, was slain in the fighting.

The mountaineers may have relented from their assaults upon realizing the Mamluk troops were the elite units of the sultan and not the lower-ranking troops of Damascus. Afterward, Baydara negotiated the withdrawal of his men after sending gifts to the mountain chiefs and releasing captives. Upon the troops' return to Damascus, Baydara's lieutenants lodged complaints to the sultan, accusing their commander of incompetence and bribery. He was nonetheless spared any serious punishment by al-Ashraf Khalil.

== 1300 campaign ==
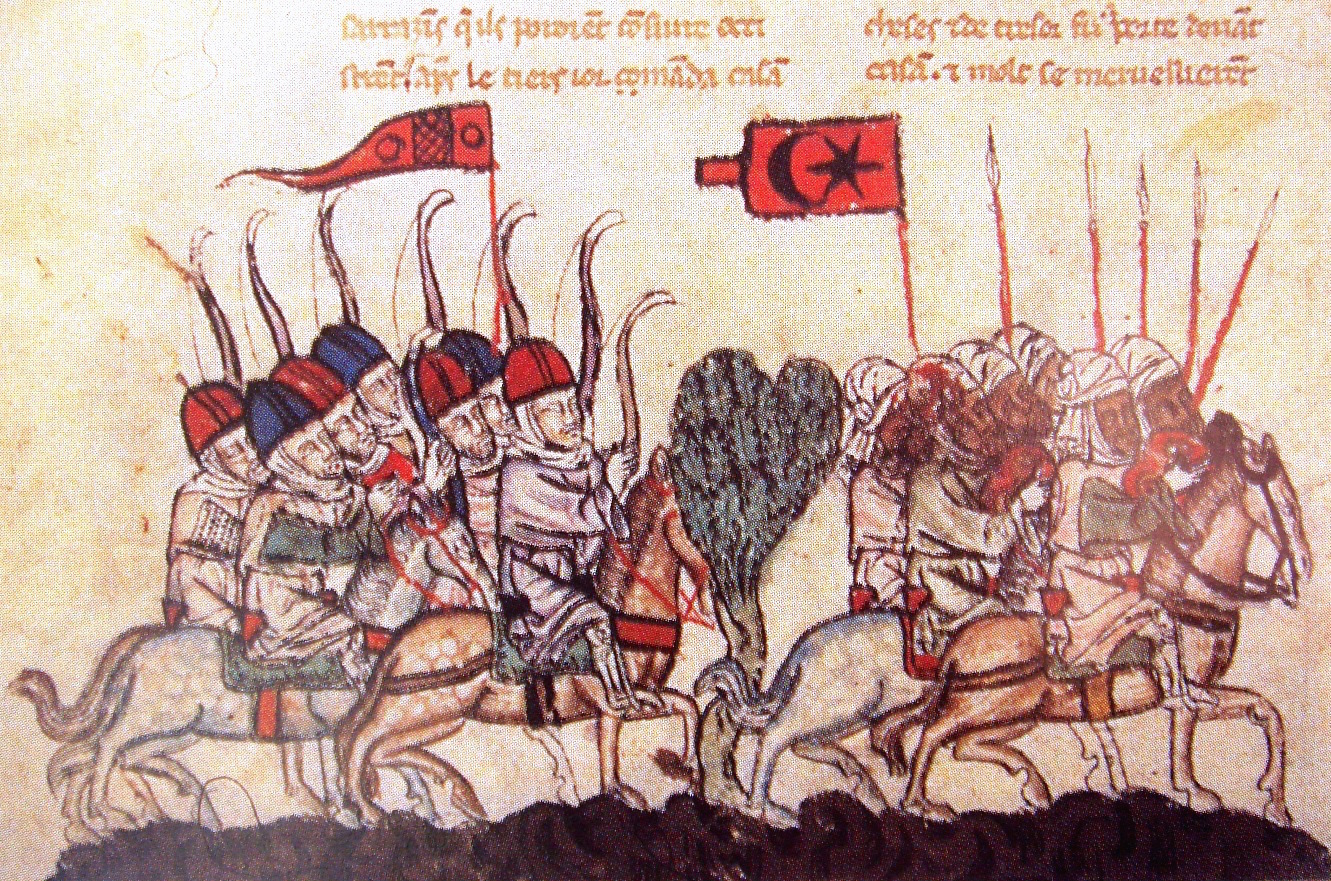
An illustration of the Battle of Wadi al-Khaznadar in 1299

Throughout the 1290s, the Mamluks consolidated their defenses in Mount Lebanon and the adjacent coast. They formalized their alliance with the Tanukh Buhturids, Druze emirs of the Gharb (the mountainous area south of Beirut) by incorporating them into the military. The Buhturids were posted to guard Beirut from future Crusader naval assaults and piracy. In Tripoli, the Mamluks rebuilt and refortified the city, making it the capital of Niyabat Tripoli (Tripoli Province), whose jurisdiction extended to Latakia and Homs in the north and east, as well as the Kisrawan. A 4,000-strong garrison of Mamluk troops was stationed in the city.

The Mongols of the Ilkhanate led by their ruler Ghazan launched a surprise offensive against the Mamluks in December 1299, routing a Mamluk army at Wadi al-Khaznadar near Homs. A panicked Mamluk flight was precipitated, with troops marching south along the Levantine coast until crossing east into the Beqaa Valley from Beirut. During their evacuation through this route, the mountaineers of the Kisrawan, likely interpreting the withdrawal as a collapse of Mamluk rule in the Levant, attacked and robbed passing Mamluk troops. The Buhturids, on the other hand, provided the troops safe haven in the Gharb. The Mongol victory was short lived and the Mamluks drove them out of the Levant by 1300.

In retaliation against the fighters of the Kisrawan, who al-Ayni dubbed "the most extreme turncoats and freethinkers", the Mamluks organized a large punitive expedition. The army was composed of the provincial garrisons of Damascus, Tripoli, Hama and Safed under the command of Aqqush al-Afram, the viceroy of Damascus. The Kisrawanis prepared their defenses and entrenched themselves in the mountains, which the 15th-century Mamluk historian al-Maqrizi noted were "difficult to invade". The Mamluks assaulted the Kisrawani positions from several sides on 9 July 1300. After six days of fighting, the mountaineers conceded, several of their men having been killed and captured. Mamluk troops then entered their strongholds and summoned their chiefs, who handed over the weapons seized from the Mamluks in the 1292 campaign. A 100,000-dirham penalty was imposed on the Kisrawan and Aqqush returned to Damascus with a number of Kisrawani elders and chiefs as hostages.

== 1305 campaign ==
The campaign of 1300 did not end rebel activity in the Kisrawan and the Jurd. In the assessment of Harris, "reduction of the Kisrawan required the main Mamluk field army", which was preoccupied in the war with the Mongols led by Ghazan. When the latter died in 1304, these forces were freed up to focus on the mountaineers, who had revolted against Mamluk authority that year. Several Muslim scholars were sent by the government to resolve the crisis diplomatically. Aqqush al-Afram sent the openly Twelver Shia naqib al-ashraf (head of the Islamic prophet Muhammad's descendants) of Damascus, Muhammad ibn Adnan al-Husayni, to mediate between the two sides, but his effort failed. The Hanbali cleric Ibn Taymiyya was also sent, but his entreaties to the mountaineers to embrace state-sponsored Sunni Islam were rebuffed. Consequently, Ibn Taymiyya advocated their suppression by force. To that end, he rallied Muslims across the Levant to join the impending Mamluk expedition against the Kisrawan and the Jurd.

Al-Ayni, al-Maqrizi and the 15th-century, Gharb-based Druze historian Salih ibn Yahya recorded the number of Mamluk troops marching from Damascus at 50,000, in addition to the troops of Tripoli marching from the north and the Druze warriors of the Gharb, led by the Buhturid emir Nasir al-Din Husayn ibn Khidr. Harris considers the number to be exaggerated, but notes that it reflects the wide scale of the operation. Overall command of the Mamluk force was held again by Aqqush. The Druze Abu al-Lama family were among the leaders of the mountaineers.

The Mamluks set off in July 1305. The first clash occurred at the village of Sawfar, near the mountain pass of Dahr al-Baydar on the road between Damascus and Beirut. The Mamluks routed the mountaineers and pursued them into the Kisrawan heights. There, they assaulted the mountaineers in multiple pincer movements. The mountaineers were defeated in the ensuing battles, with several hundred killed and six hundred taken as captives. A number of high-ranking Mamluk emirs and two Buhturid emirs, Nasir al-Din's cousins Najm al-Din Muhammad ibn Hajji and his brother Ahmad, were slain.

Through August 1305 the Mamluks destroyed villages, pillaged the countryside, leveled churches, ruined vineyards, and expelled numerous inhabitants. The destruction of churches was recorded only by Maronite historians, the omission in the Muslim accounts likely due to the operation's emphasis against the non-Sunni Muslims. By 5 January 1306 the Mamluks completed their operation. A local Maronite chronicler, possibly contemporary to the events, noted that "not a monastery, church, or fort was saved from destruction". The 14th-century historian Abu al-Fida of Hama noted that the Mamluks "killed and seized all the Alawites and renegades they encountered, and other heretics, and cleared them out of the hills". Ibn Taymiyya wrote a letter to the sultan congratulating him for its success and for subjugating the "Rafida" (derogatory term for Shia Muslims) of the Kisrawan. The Twelvers were not completely expelled from the area, though several families were forcibly relocated to Tripoli by the governor of the province. The Buhturids diplomatically intervened to prevent the total evacuation of the Kisrawan, some of whose inhabitants were their confederates.

== Aftermath and long-term consequences ==
After the campaign, the Kisrawan was administratively separated from Tripoli and became part of Wilayat Beirut (Beirut District) in Niyabat Damascus. In the immediate aftermath, the Mamluks allotted lands in the Kisrawan to a Mamluk commander, Ala al-Din of the Beqaa Valley. In early 1306, A number of Sunni Muslim Turkmen tribesmen who had settled in the Akkar and Koura hinterlands north and south of Tripoli city after the collapse of the Crusader state were resettled in the Kisrawan. The Mamluks later transferred Ala al-Din's lands to them. Their role was to serve as permanent, direct guards of the area's key roads. Among these Turkmen tribes were the progenitors of the Assaf dynasty, which remained in practical control of the Kisrawan into the first century of Ottoman rule (1516–1917). The Buhturids' status was further enhanced, their emirs were promoted and their guard duties over Beirut were formalized. Tensions later developed between the Turkmens and the Buhturids over influence in greater Beirut in the following decades.

The Alawites of the Kisrawan disappeared from the historical record after the campaign. The Twelvers continued to be the largest confessional group in the area, though they were permanently removed from the coastal villages and their numbers were reduced, likely never recovering to pre-1305 levels. Little is mentioned of them in the 14th and 15th centuries. Among the Shia who remained may have been the ancestors of the Hamade family, clients of the Assafs who became the dominant force in the countryside of Tripoli in the 18th century. The mass population displacements in the Kisrawan made way for new arrivals to settle there. Theodorus noted that "after several years Christians from every region started coming into the country [Kisrawan]". The Assafs played a role facilitating the migration of Maronites from the Byblos hills into the Kisrawan. In the end, the Mamluks were unable to continuously pacify the region and adapted to working with the mostly Shia and Christian mountaineers.

== Historiography ==
The 14th and 15th-century Muslim accounts of the campaigns indicate that the rebels belonged to heterodox Muslim sects, i.e. Twelver Shia, Alawites and Druze. Modern historians generally follow the early Muslim chronicles in determining Shia Muslims as the campaigns' principal target. Winter states that the campaigns to subjugate the rebel mountaineers of Kisrawan are "doubtless the best-known episode in the history of Mamluk–Shiite [Shia] relations". While the near-contemporary Muslim chroniclers do not mention Christians in their accounts of the campaigns, Ottoman-era Maronite historians emphasize the episode as an example of their community's standoff against the oppressiveness of the Muslim authorities. The historian Kamal Salibi notes that Christians became a larger segment of the Kisrawan's population after the campaign, but "suffered from the expeditions as much as did the heterodox Muslims". In the historian Stefan Winter's assessment, the campaigns had little to do with religious zeal and were driven by the mountaineers' attacks against Mamluk troops in 1292 and 1300 and a tax rebellion in 1305.

The Kisrawan campaigns are among "the most contested issues in Lebanese historiography" due largely to the "evidence they appear to give of the region's demographic composition", according to Winter. The historian Ahmed Beydoun characterizes the competing approaches to the expedition by modern Lebanese authors from different religious communities as efforts to "boost the community with which the historian identifies". The modern Lebanese narrative of the Mamluk expeditions, along with the historical topics of the core Lebanese population, the identity of the 7th-century Mardaites, and the significance of the local, Ottoman-era governor Fakhr al-Din II, thus varies considerably depending on the religious affiliation of the author.

Beydoun describes the efforts by 20th-century Maronite authors to emphasize the Maronite role in the events as an attempt to prove the community's early presence in the Kisrawan. In this way, the Maronites' abandonment of the region in the aftermath of the campaigns could be described as a "forced exile" and the Maronite settlement of the Kisrawan in the 16th and 17th centuries as their "return". On the other hand, Beydoun views the narratives of the expeditions by modern Shia Lebanese historians, which emphasize Shia Muslims' defense of the mountains' autonomy from the Mamluks, as part of an effort to bolster Shia credentials as a core Lebanese community. Lebanese Sunni authors generally write of the campaigns from a pro-Mamluk stance, seeing in them the legitimate Muslim state's efforts to incorporate Mount Lebanon into the Islamic realm, while Druze authors write with a focus on the Druze community's consistent connection to Mount Lebanon and defense of its practical autonomy.

== Bibliography ==
- Al-Muhajir, Ja'far (1992). The Foundation for the History of the Shiites in Lebanon and Syria: The First Scientific Study on the History of the Shiites in the Region (in Arabic). Beirut: Dar Al-Malak.
- Harris, William (2012). Lebanon: A History, 600–2011. New York: Oxford University Press. ISBN 978-0-19-518-111-1.
- Reilly, James A. (2016). The Ottoman Cities of Lebanon: Historical Legacy and Identity in the Modern Middle East. London: I. B. Tauris. ISBN 978-1-78672-036-8.
- Richards, D. S., ed. (2010). The Chronicle of Ibn al-Athir for the Crusading Period, from al-Kamil fi'l-Ta'rikh: Part 1, The Years 491–541/1097–1146: The Coming of the Franks and the Muslim Response. Farnham and Burlington: Ashgate. ISBN 978-0-7546-4077-6.
- Salibi, Kamal S. (September 1957). "The Maronites of Lebanon under Frankish and Mamluk Rule (1099–1516)". Arabica. 4 (3): 288–303. doi:10.1163/157005857X00057. JSTOR 4055054.
- Salibi, Kamal S. (January 1961). "The Buḥturids of the Garb. Mediaeval Lords of Beirut and of Southern Lebanon". Arabica. 8 (1): 74–97. doi:10.1163/157005861X00043. JSTOR 4054971.
- Salibi, Kamal S. (June 1967). "Northern Lebanon under the Dominance of Ġazīr (1517–1591)". Arabica. 14 (2): 144–166. doi:10.1163/157005867X00029. JSTOR 4055631.
- Winter, Stefan (2010). The Shiites of Lebanon under Ottoman Rule, 1516-1788. Cambridge University Press. doi:10.1017/CBO9780511676413. ISBN 978-0-521-76584-8.
- Winter, Stefan (2016). A History of the 'Alawis: From Medieval Aleppo to the Turkish Republic. Princeton and Oxford: Princeton University Press. ISBN 9780691173894.
