= Tannus al-Shidyaq =

Maronite clerk (c. 1794–1861)

Tannus ibn Yusuf al-Shidyaq (c. 1794 – 1861), also transliterated Tannous el-Chidiac, was a Maronite clerk and emissary of the Shihab emirs, the feudal chiefs and tax farmers of Ottoman Mount Lebanon, and a chronicler best known for his work on the noble families of Mount Lebanon, Akhbar al-a'yan fi Jabal Lubnan (The History of the Notables in Mount Lebanon). He was born in the Keserwan area of Mount Lebanon to a long line of clerks serving the Shihab emirs and other local chieftains. Tannus was taught Arabic and Syriac grammar and throughout his career serving the Shihab emirs and as a merchant, he pursued education in the fields of medicine, jurisprudence, logic, ethics, natural sciences, Turkish and Italian.

Tannus wrote manuscripts about his Maronite sect, Arab and Islamic history, the colloquial Arabic of Mount Lebanon and his family, some of which were lost. The most important of his works was Akhbar al-a'yan fi Jabal Lubnan, which was supervised by Butrus al-Bustani, and published in separate parts in 1855 and 1859. In it he described the natural and political geography of Mount Lebanon, documented the genealogies of its feudal families, and chronicled the history of its rule by families, such as the Buhturids, the Ma'ns, the Assafs, the Sayfas and the Shihabs. His chronicle has been one of the main sources for modern-day histories of Mamluk and Ottoman Lebanon.

== Biography ==
=== Family ===
Tannus was likely born around 1794. He was the eldest of five sons of Abu Husayn Yusuf al-Shidyaq, the other four being Mansur, As'ad, Ghalib and Faris. The Shidyaqs were learned Maronite laymen originally from ancient Syria and later resident in the Keserwan area of central Mount Lebanon. Members of the family served as teachers and clerks for the Muslim, Christian and Druze nobility of Mount Lebanon and its environs from the early 17th century. Their education and relationships with the leading nobility placed them in the second strata of the local aristocracy and as such their members held the title of shaykh, a local rank below emir and equal to that of the feudal chieftains of the area.

Tannus's grandfather Mansur left Keserwan to serve the Shia emir of Baalbek, Haydar al-Harfush in 1741 for two years, and then moved to Hazmiyeh near Beirut in 1755 where he served the Shihab emir Qasim ibn Umar, the father of Bashir II. He eventually settled in Hadath, continuing to work for Qasim until the latter's death in 1768, after which he worked for two other Shihab emirs. Tannus's father succeeded Mansur and later served the Shihab emir Hasan ibn Umar, who moved him back to the Shidyaq ancestral village of Ashqout in Keserwan.

=== Education, service with Shihab emirs, and mercantile career ===
Tannus was about 10 years old when his family relocated to Ashqout and there is no information about his early education; the modern historian Kamal Salibi presumes he was homeschooled. He was taught rudimentary Arabic and Syriac by teacher Yusuf al-Hukayyim in the nearby village of Ghosta in 1809. His studies were interrupted before the year's end when Bashir II, who had become the paramount strongman and tax farmer of Mount Lebanon, appointed Tannus's father the mutasallim (tax collector) of Shuweir in the Matn area south of Keserwan and soon after of Zahle in the Beqaa Valley as well. The family consequently moved back to Hadath where Tannus taught As'ad the Arabic and Syriac grammar he had learned in Ghosta. In 1810 he served as a clerk for the Shihab emir Salman Ali and assisted him in conscription efforts in Shahhar, near Beirut.

In 1813 Tannus was sent to learn at the Maronite monastic institution of Ayn Warqa, the most prestigious Maronite school at that time whose pupils included Butrus al-Bustani. Several bouts of headaches compelled him to end his studies there before the end of the year, after which his brother As'ad took his place. After As'ad graduated in 1818 Tannus studied ethics with him.

Tannus began his career in commerce in 1818, engaging in business in Damascus where he also represented the Shihabs in a minor political embassy that year. He continued his mercantile career until his death and was also employed by the Shihabs as a political agent and spy, giving him significant insight into the political intrigues of his age. He participated with Bashir II's forces in battle against the Ottoman governor of Damascus in 1821.

As a result of the death of his father in 1821, Tannus became financially responsible for his mother, his two younger sisters, Adla and Wardiyya and his brother Faris. Sometime afterward he married and had two sons, Faris and Naja, the first of whom died in infancy. After the deaths of his brothers Ghalib in 1840 and Mansur in 1842, he also became responsible for the former's young sons Zahir and Bishara and Ghalib's son. His mercantile business reported deficits for most of the period between 1821 and 1856 and to meet the needs of his increased dependents, he earned extra income as a teacher and copyist. He also began studying medicine in 1823 and began practicing six years later.

Tannus continued his education in different fields, studying logic in 1832, Turkish and Italian in 1835, natural sciences in 1848 and jurisprudence in 1849. During that last year he also studied rhetoric with Nasif al-Yaziji, a prominent Arabic author from Mount Lebanon.

=== Religion ===
Unlike his better known brothers As'ad, who became a Protestant, and Faris, who converted to Islam and adopted the name Ahmad, Tannus remained a devout Maronite. He attempted, unsuccessfully, to dissuade As'ad from embracing Protestant teachings; As'ad eventually died in the custody of the Maronite Church for his beliefs. In his career during the 1840s, a decade marked by strife between the Druze and Maronites of Mount Lebanon, Tannus advocated for the Maronite notables.

== Literary works ==
Tannus began writing historical works in 1833, starting with Tarikh al-ta'ifa al-Maruniyya (History of the Maronite Sect), a now lost summary of the Maronite historian and patriarch Istifan al-Duwayhi's 17th-century history of the Maronites. He also wrote a Lebanese colloquial Arabic dictionary, which was read by the American missionary Eli Smith but whose whereabouts are currently unknown. He penned an unfinished book on the Turkish language in 1835 and summarized another work of al-Duwayhi's, Tarikh al-azmina (History of the Times), in 1845. Three years later he wrote a history of Arab and Islamic rulers, which is also lost. In 1850 Tannus wrote a history of his family, the principal source of his biography, entitled Tarikh wa a'mal banu ash-Shidyaq (History and Achievements of the Shidyaqs).

=== The History of the Notables in Mount Lebanon ===
The most important of Tannus's works was Akhbar al-a'yan fi Jabal Lubnan (The History of the Notables in Mount Lebanon), which he completed in 1855. The printed work was 770 pages and divided into three parts. The first part centered on the natural and political geography of Mount Lebanon and its surroundings and consisted of five chapters: the first chapter defined the boundaries of Mount Lebanon and surveyed its population; the second summarized the histories of the eight principal coastal towns of the Phoenicians, namely Tripoli, Batroun, Byblos, Jounieh, Beirut, Sidon, Tyre and Acre; the third described the mountain's nine main rivers; the fourth detailed the feudal districts of the mountain and the fifth was a table of the population.

The second part of Akhbar al-a'yan was devoted to the genealogies of the feudal families of Mount Lebanon, with each family entitled to a chapter and grouped into three categories: Muslims, Maronites and Druze—the originally Muslim and Druze Shihab and Abi'l-Lama families, at least parts of which converted to Christianity, were grouped with the Maronites.

The third and longest part of Akhbar al-a'yan dealt with the dynastic and feudal rulers of Mount Lebanon, beginning with the "Mardaite" rulers of the northern parts of the mountain before proceeding in separate chapters, not in chronological order, with the rule of the Buhturids of the Gharb, the Ma'nids of the Chouf, the Assafs of Keserwan, the Sayfas of Akkar, the Shihabs, the Abi'l-Lamas and the Arslans of the Gharb.

Tannus cited as his sources the Maronite historian Ibn al-Qila'i (d. 1516), the Druze historian Ibn Sibat (d. 1520), al-Duwayhi, Haydar al-Shihabi (d. 1821), the biography of Fakhr al-Din II by al-Khalidi al-Safadi (d. 1624), Father Joseph Assemanus (d. 1782), Father Hananiyya al-Munayyir (d. 1820) of Zouk Mosbeh, the Melkite poet Butrus Karami of Homs (d. 1851), and oral and printed histories and court registers of the Shihab, Jumblatt, Khazen, Hubaysh and Talhuq genealogies. The first and second parts of the book were published on 13 June 1855 by the American Press under the oversight of Butrus al-Bustani. The third part was published on 26 May 1859.

According to the historian Youssef Choueiri, Tannus's "reputation as a chronicler largely rests on his Akhbar al-a'yan". Salibi interprets Akhbar al-a'yan as the work of a Maronite layman, who wrote "as a Lebanese rather than a Maronite", without consideration to the theological activism of earlier Maronite historians such as Duwayhi and Ibn al-Qilai. The historian Philip Hitti deemed it to be the work "a judge of the Shihab amirs and compiler of the annals of the feudal families of Lebanon". Asad Rustum commented on the Akhbar al-a'yan: "in a way, Shidyak's history is scarcely anything but an account of the Emir [Bashir]'s efforts to rid himself of his rivals".

== Bibliography ==
- Choueiri, Youssef M. (2003) [1989]. Modern Arab Historiography: Historical Discourse and the Nation-State. London and New York: RoutledgeCurzon. ISBN 0-7007-1602-5.
- Salibi, Kamal S. (1959). Maronite Historians of Mediæval Lebanon. Beirut: American University of Beirut. ISBN 9780404170356.
