= Ibn Sibat =

Ḥamza ibn Aḥmad ibn Sibāṭ al-Faqīh al-ʿĀlayhī (Arabic: حمزة بن أحمد بن سباط الفقيه) (died 1520) was a Druze historian and a scribe of the Buhturid emirs of Mount Lebanon.

== Life and work ==
Hamza was based in Aley in the Gharb area southeast of Beirut in Mount Lebanon. His father Shihab al-Din Ahmad ibn Umar ibn Salih (d. 1482) was a disciple of the reformist Druze religious leader al-Sayyid Abd Allah al-Tanukhi and the imam of his mosque in Abeih. Hamza was one of two sons of Shihab al-Din, the other being Zayn al-Din Abd al-Rahman (d. 1491). Like al-Sayyid al-Tanukhi and the Buhturid emirs of the Gharb, the Sibat family were descendants of the Tanukh, an Arab tribe which was long established in the Gharb. Part of his work chronicled the Tanukh's history, before and after their acceptance and propagation of the Druze doctrine in the early 11th century.

Hamza chronicled the medieval history of Mount Lebanon. His work was largely based on the chronicle of the Buhturid chronicler Salih ibn Yahya (d. 1435). Ibn Sibat continued the history of Mount Lebanon for the rest of the 15th century through the first years of Ottoman rule, which began in 1516. For the history of his own time, he relied on his personal observations. He is a principal source for the history of the Druze Ma'n dynasty of the Chouf in the closing years of Mamluk rule in the 1490s through 1516 and the first interactions of the Ma'ns and the Buhturids with the Ottoman conquerors. The 17th-century Maronite historian and patriarch Istifan al-Duwayhi and the 19th-century Maronite historian Tannus al-Shidyaq depended mainly on Hamza's chronicle for their histories of non-Maronite Mount Lebanon.

== Bibliography ==
- Abu-Husayn, Abdul-Rahim (1985). Provincial Leaderships in Syria, 1575-1650. Beirut: American University of Beirut. ISBN 9780815660729.
- Firro, Kais M. (2011). "The Druze Faith: Origin, Development and Interpretation". Arabica. 58 (1): 76–99. doi:10.1163/157005811X550309. JSTOR 41330761.
- Hourani, Alexander (2010). New Documents on the History of Mount Lebanon and Arabistan in the 10th and 11th Centuries H. Beirut.
- Salibi, Kamal S. (1959). Maronite Historians of Mediæval Lebanon. Beirut: American University of Beirut. ISBN 9780404170356.
- Salibi, Kamal S. (2005). The Druze: Realities & Perceptions. London: Druze Heritage Foundation. ISBN 9781904850069.
