= Aqqush al-Afram =

Emir Aqqush al-Afram
- آقوش الأفرم

Na'ib (Viceroy) of Damascus
- In office 25 February 1299 – 1309
- Monarch: Al-Nasir Muhammad
- Preceded by: Sayf al-Din Qibjak
- Succeeded by: Qarasunqur al-Mansuri

Governor of Hamadan
- In office 1312–1336
- Monarch: Oljaitu

Personal details
- Died: 1336 Hamadan, Ilkhanate
- Relations: Aydamur al-Zardakash (father-in-law)

Military service
- Allegiance: Mamluk Sultanate of Egypt (former); Ilkhanate
- Branch/service: Mamluk Army (former); Ilkhanid Army
- Battles/wars: Siege of Al-Rahba

Jamal al-Din Aqqush al-Afram al-Mansuri (Arabic: جمال الدين آقوش الأفرم المنصوري; died 1336) was a high-ranking Mamluk emir and defector, who served as the Mamluk na'ib (viceroy) of Damascus and later the Ilkhanid governor of Hamadan.

== Mamluk emir ==
Aqqush al-Afram was an ethnic Circassian enslaved via the Black Sea slave trade and began his career as a mamluk (slave soldier) of Sultan Qalawun (r. 1279–1290) in the Mansuriyya corps. He was the governor of al-Karak, the desert fortress capital of a province spanning much of Transjordan.

=== Na'ib (Viceroy) of Damascus ===
On 25 February 1299 Aqqush was promoted as viceroy of Damascus. This followed the defection of his predecessor there, Sayf al-Din Qibjak, to the Baghdad-based Mongol Ilkhanate. Aqqush held office until 1309. In 1300 and 1305 he led the punitive campaigns against the Shia Muslim and Alawite mountaineers of the Kisrawan, an area in Mount Lebanon. The rebellion was suppressed with mass destruction of villages. He was commended by the historian al-Safadi for his valor, strategic planning against Ilkhanid offensives, care for the poor in his jurisdiction and hunting skills. Aqqush was highly regarded by the people of Damascus, particularly for his battlefield reputation, and often adorned their clothes or weapons with his heraldic symbols. He wielded considerable power within the province, appointing officials unilaterally and only informing the central government in Cairo afterward. At the time, Mamluk strongmen, namely the emirs Salar and Baybars al-Jashnakir, held the reins of power, the sultan al-Nasir Muhammad playing a largely ceremonial role. Aqqush considered himself equals to Baybars and Salar and once remarked that were it not for his "ablaq palace, green square, and beautiful river [in Damascus], I would not have left them alone to rejoice in the kingship of Egypt [capital of the sultanate]".

Viewing himself of high stature, he attempted to marry the Ilkhanid princess El Qutlugh Khatun during his rule over Damascus, as marrying into Mongol royalty was rare and considered prestigious. She rebuffed his entreaties, however, and it is not mentioned in the sources that he married a Mongol woman.

== Defection to the Ilkhanate ==
Aqqush fled the Mamluk realm with his father-in-law Aydamur al-Zardakash and the high-ranking emir Qarasunqur in 1312 due to fears of punishment by Sultan al-Nasir Muhammad (r. 1310–1341). The latter had returned to power for the third time and rumors of his ill disposal toward Aqqush and Qarasunqur had reached the two emirs. They were welcomed by the Ilkhanid khan Öljaitü, who appointed Aqqush governor of Hamadan. Aqqush served the post until his death in 1336.

Aqqush and Qarasunqur encouraged the last major Ilkhanid offensive against Mamluk Syria, which was the failed siege of the Euphrates fortress of al-Rahba in 1313.

== Bibliography ==
- Brack, Yoni (July 2011). "A Mongol Princess Making Hajj: The Biography of El Qutlugh Daughter of Abagha Ilkhan (r. 1265–82)". Journal of the Royal Asiatic Society. 21 (3): 331–359. doi:10.1017/S1356186311000265. S2CID 162431130.
- Daftary, Farhad (1996). Mediaeval Isma'ili History and Thought. Cambridge: Cambridge University Press. ISBN 0-521-45140-X.
- Guo, Li (1998). Early Mamluk Syrian Historiography: Al-Yūnīnī's Dhayl Mirʼāt Al-zamān, Volume 1. Leiden, Boston and Koln: Brill. ISBN 90-04-11028-3.
- Harris, William (2012). Lebanon: A History, 600–2011. New York: Oxford University Press. ISBN 978-0-19-518-111-1.
