= Siege of al-Rahba =

Last military engagement of the Mamluk-Ilkhanid War (1312–1313)

Siege of al-Rahba (1312–1313)
- Part of the Mamluk-Ilkhanid War
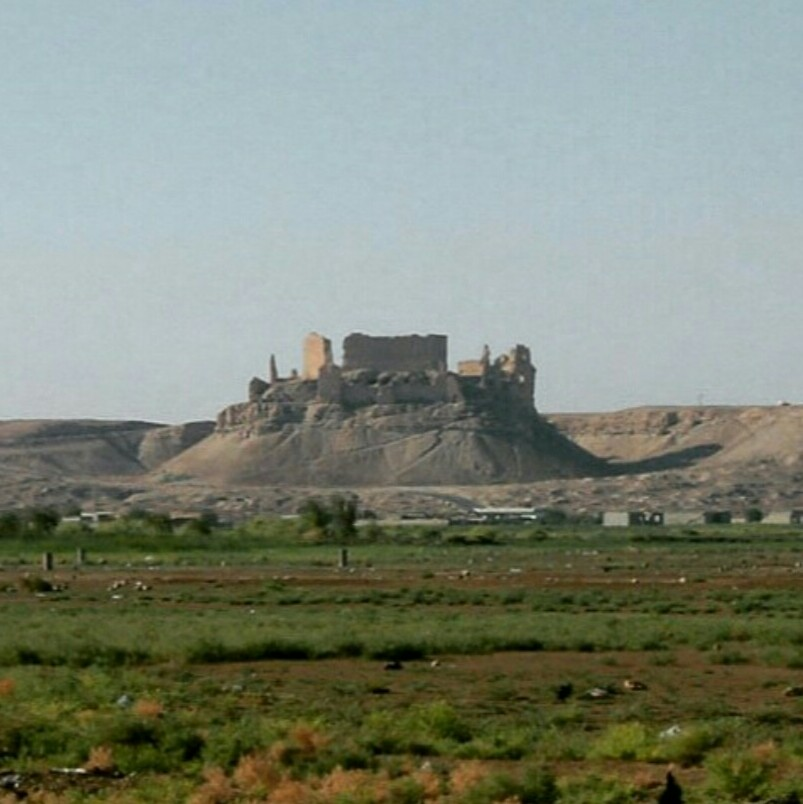
- Al-Rahba castle
Date	23 December 1312 – 26 January 1313
Location	Al-Rahba, Mamluk Sultanate (modern-day Mayadin, Dayr az-Zawr Governorate, Syria) 35.005°N 40.4235°E
Result	Mamluk victory

Belligerents
Ilkhanate	Mamluk Sultanate

Commanders and leaders
(Ilkhanate) Öljaitü (Ilkhanate) Qaransunqur (Ilkhanate) Aqqush al-Afram (Ilkhanate) Sulaiman ibn Muhanna	Ibn al-Azkashi

Strength
Unknown	Unknown

Casualties and losses
Heavy	Unknown

The siege of al-Rahba was a military engagement between the invading Ilkhanate Mongols and the Egyptian Mamluk al-Rahba garrison. It was the last military engagement of the Mamluk-Ilkhanid War.

In 1312, the Mamluk sultan of Egypt, al-Nasir Muhammad, began forming his own Mamluk emirs instead of Syrian ones. Having formed 46 new Emirs, he began eliminating the Emirs who had brought him to power. Only two emirs managed to escape the purge: Qaransunqur, "nai'b" (deputy) of Damascus, and Aqqush al-Afram, "nai'b" of Tripoli, who escaped to the Ilkhanate territory with 600 Mamluks. The two Mamluk emirs convinced the Ilkhanate ruler, Öljaitü, to attack the Mamluks, to which he agreed.

The Mongol army set out in October from the city of Mosul. Mamluk spies in Baghdad were informed of this and went to inform the Mamluk Sultan of the upcoming invasion. The Mongol march was slow, only moving nine miles a day, which allowed the Mamluks to prepare before their arrival. The Mongols arrived at the walls of al-Rahba Castle and began the siege of the castle on December 23, the month of Ramadan.

The castle of al-Rahba was well-supplied, garrisoned, and prepared, led by the "nai'b," Ibn al-Azkashi. The Mongols launched several assaults against the walls, and the Mamluks repelled several of their assaults, causing heavy casualties to the Mongols. The Mongols found themselves in a difficult position; they began running out of provisions and fodder. Mongol sources attribute the failure of the siege to the hot weather. The Mongols raised the siege on January 26 of the next year. They left all of their siege equipment, and the Mamluk garrison marched out and captured them, taking them to the citadel.

The Mongols never returned to attack the Mamluks again, instead engaging in diplomacy with the Mamluks. The failure of the siege was part of the crumbling situation of the Ilkhanate. The economy was falling. The Khanate was split into two administrative governments. Öljaitü returned to drinking and would die on December 1316.

== Sources ==
- James Waterson (2022), The Knights of Islam, The Wars of the Mamluks, 1250 - 1517.
- E. J. Brill (1993), E.J. Brill's First Encyclopaedia of Islam Vol. VI.
- Josef W. Meri (2005), Medieval Islamic Civilization, An Encyclopedia.
