= Ibn al-Azkashi =

Na'ib (deputy) of al-Rahba

Emir Ibn al-Azkashi
- ابن الأزكشي; Ibn El-Azkaşî

Na'ib (deputy) of Al-Rahba
- In office 1303–1315
- Monarch: al-Nasir Muhammad
- Preceded by: Alam al-Din Sanjar al-Ghutami
- Succeeded by: Baktut al-Karamani

Personal details
- Died: Friday 8 Sha'ban 715 AH / November 1315 Damascus, Mamluk Sultanate
- Resting place: al-Qubaybat
- Parent: Sayf al-Din Abi Bakr Muhammad al-Azkashi
- Occupation: Military commander, politician

Military service
- Allegiance: Mamluk Sultanate
- Branch/service: Military of the Mamluk Sultanate
- Rank: Amir Tabalkhana then Amir Mi'a Muqadam Alaf
- Battles/wars: Battle of Marj al-Saffar (1303); Siege of Al-Rahba

Badr al-Din Musa bin Sayf al-Din Abi Bakr Muhammad al-Azkashi (Arabic: بدر الدين موسى بن سيف الدين أبي بكر محمد الأزكشي; Kurdish: Bedir Eldîn Mûsa bîn Seyf Eldîn Ebûbekir Muhammed el-Ezkaşî; d. Sha'ban 715 AH / November 1315 AD) also known as Ibn al-Azkashi (ابن الأزكشي; Ibn El-Azkaşî) was a Marwanid Kurdish emir of the Mamluk Sultanate of Egypt. He was one of the Muqadimi al-Halqa al-Shamia in the Mamluk army that participated in the Battle of Marj al-Saffar against the Mongols in 1303. He was praised for his leadership role in the battle and his good performance in fighting the Mongols. In appreciation of his efforts, Sultan al-Nasir Muhammad bin Qalawun promoted him to the rank of Amir Tabalkhana and then appointed him as na'ib (deputy) of al-Rahba in the same year.

== Biography ==
=== Na'ib of al-Rahba ===
Emir Jamal al-Din Aqush al-Afram, the na'ib of Syria, prepared him to assume the position of na'ib of al-Rahba in 1303. Emir Al-Ashraf Musa proved highly competent in managing this niaba for more than ten years, and he has the greatest credit for resisting the Mongol campaign against al-Rahba led by the Mongol King Öljaitü in 1312. This campaign was instigated by two Mamluk emirs fleeing to him, emir Shams al-Din Qarasanqur and Jamal al-Din Aqosh al-Afram. Al-Afram had sought to promote emir Musa and place al-Rahba in his charge, so he thought that Musa would hand over the castle to him, but he refused that and resisted the great siege imposed by the Mongols on the castle until the hot weather began taking effect among their troops, so they were forced to leave, leaving behind huge siege machines of catapults and other things, which the people of al-Rahba seized.

=== Death ===
As soon as Sultan al-Nasir Muhammad arrived with his army from Egypt to the Levant, news of the departure of the Mongols had reached him. The Mongols had set traps for carrier pigeons during the siege so that the news would not reach Egypt and the Levant. When al-Nasir met with emir Musa near al-Rahba at the beginning of the following year, He admired him and promoted him to the rank of Amir Mi'a Muqadam Alaf, and emir Musa remained na'ib of al-Rahba until 715 AH/1315 AD, then he was removed from it and given command in Damascus, and Baktut al-Karamani succeeded him as na'ib of al-Rahba, and Musa remained in Damascus until he died that year on Friday, the eighth of Sha’ban, at his home in Maydan al-Hassa near Damascus, and was buried near al-Qubaybat. Emir Sayf al-Din Tankiz, the na'ib of Syria, attended his funeral.

== Bibliography ==
- Al-Nuwayri: Nihāyat al-arab fī funūn al-adab (نهاية الأرب في الأدب والفنون), part 32.
