= Siege of Beirut (1110) =

1110 battle of the Crusaders

- Part of the Crusades
Date	February – 13 May 1110
Location	Beirut, Levant
Result	Crusader victory
Territorial changes	Lordship of Beirut was created

Belligerents
Kingdom of Jerusalem; County of Toulouse; Republic of Genoa; Republic of Pisa	Fatimid Caliphate

Commanders and leaders
Baldwin I of Jerusalem; Bertrand of Toulouse	Governor of Beirut

Strength
Unknown number of Crusaders; Twenty-two Genoese galleys	Unknown

Casualties and losses
Unknown	Unknown

The siege of Beirut in 1110 occurred in the aftermath of the First Crusade. The coastal city of Beirut was captured from the Fatimids by the forces of Baldwin I of Jerusalem on 13 May 1110, with the assistance of Bertrand of Toulouse and a Genoese fleet.

== Background ==
By 1101, the Crusaders had controlled the southern ports including Jaffa, Haifa, Arsuf and Caesarea, hence they managed to cut off the northern ports including Beirut from Fatimid support by land. In addition, the Fatimids had to disperse their forces including 2,000 soldiers and 20 ships in each of the remaining ports, until the main support could arrive from Egypt. In February 1102, the Crusaders began harassing Beirut, until the Fatimid army arrived in early May.

In late autumn 1102, ships carrying Christian pilgrims to the Holy Land were forced by storm to land in the vicinity of Ascalon, Sidon and Tyre. The pilgrims were either slain or taken as slaves to Egypt. Hence, controlling the ports became urgent for the safety of pilgrims, in addition to the arrival of men and supply from Europe.

== Siege ==
By February 1110, the Genoese and Pisan ships started to blockade the harbour, Fatimid ships from Tyre and Sidon tried in vain to break the blockade. In the meantime, the Beirut's defenders destroyed one siege tower, but the attackers managed to build another two to storm the walls.

Jacques de Vitry, a 13th-century historian of the Crusades, reported:

Our people lay siege to Beyrout both by sea and land, and being joined by Bertram, the noble count of Tripoli, after a two months' siege, having brought wooden towers up to the walls and joined them to the walls by ladders, forced their way into the city, and slew many of the citizens, cast the rest into chains and held them captive . . . Beyrout is a city on the seashore between Sidon and Biblium in the country of Phoenicia ... it is fertile and fair, with fruit trees, woods and vineyards.

William of Tyre writes that Baldwin and Bertrand ordered galleys from the nearby controlled ports to blockade Beirut, while constructing all siege towers, ladders, bridges and catapults from the pine trees in the neighborhood. The city defended its walls for two months, until some Crusaders managed to scale the walls and open the gates. The inhabitants escaped to the port, yet the blockade forced them to retreat, hence they became trapped between two enemies.

The Fatimid governor fled by night through the Italian fleet to Cyprus. On 13 May 1110, Baldwin captured the city by assault after a 75-day siege. The Italians conducted a massacre among the inhabitants, in which 20,000 Arabs might have been possibly killed by the attackers in Beirut.

== Aftermath ==
After the fall of Beirut, Baldwin celebrated Pentecost in Jerusalem, and then hurried along with Bertrand to the County of Edessa to fight against Mawdud's invasion. By the end of the year, Baldwin had captured Sidon with assistance from Sigurd I of Norway.
