= William Harris (historian) =

English dissenting minister and historian (1720–1770)

- Born: 1720; Salisbury, England, Great Britain
- Died: February 1770 (aged 49–50)
- Burial place: Honiton, England, United Kingdom
- Education: University of Glasgow (DD)

William Harris, D.D. (1720 – February 1770) was an English dissenting minister and historian who wrote a series of historically significant biographies of the House of Stuart kings of 17th-century Britain.

== Life ==
Harris was born in Salisbury, Wiltshire, and was educated at a dissenting academy in Taunton, Somerset, under Thomas Amory and Henry Grove. He became a lay-preacher at age 18, and was ordained in 1741. He married Elizabeth Bovet of Honiton in Devon and became preacher at a Presbyterian chapel in the nearby village of Luppitt, where he was to remain for the rest of his life.

In 1765, Harris's friend and patron, the wealthy philanthropist and fellow-libertarian Thomas Hollis, helped secure for him the degree of Doctor in Divinity from the University of Glasgow and wrote of him: "All his works have been well received, and those who differ from him in principle still value him in point of industry and faithfulness." London bookseller Andrew Millar may have been asked by Hollis to recommend Harris to the post. Millar's business and family connections linked Hollis, Harris, and Principal William Leechman (whose sermons were sold by Millar), while another of Millar's associates recalled that Hollis's recommendation to Leechman had been made "by the means of a friend".

Harris became ill and died, aged 49, before he was able to write a biography of the last of the Stuart kings, James II of England. He is buried in St Michael's Churchyard at Honiton and his will is preserved in The National Archives in London.

== Works ==
Motivated by his nonconformist faith and libertarian politics, Harris "resolved to become the biographer of the English branch of the Stuart family, and of Cromwell".

After writing a life of the English Civil War regicide Hugh Peters (1751), Harris published An Historical and Critical Account of the Life and Writings of James the First, King of Great Britain (1753), which was to prove his most controversial work because of its very negative but highly detailed portrait of James VI and I as a bad monarch and a deeply flawed human being. He followed it with biographies of Charles I of England (1758), Oliver Cromwell (1761) and Charles II of England (1765).

Harris's biographies were based on masses of documentary evidence, thus his many criticisms of the Stuart kings were closely argued. The books were popular, and reputedly resold second-hand for "an enormous price". The Cromwell biography joined those by Isaac Kimber (1724) and John Bancks (1739) in giving a nonconformist view, with an appeal probably restricted at that time to dissenters.

After his death, all five works were republished together. They appeared as An Historical and Critical Account of the Lives and Writings of James I and Charles I and of the Lives of Oliver Cromwell and Charles II (5 volumes, London, 1814).
