= Kamal Salibi =

Lebanese academic, writer, historian and researcher (1929-2011)

Professor Kamal Salibi
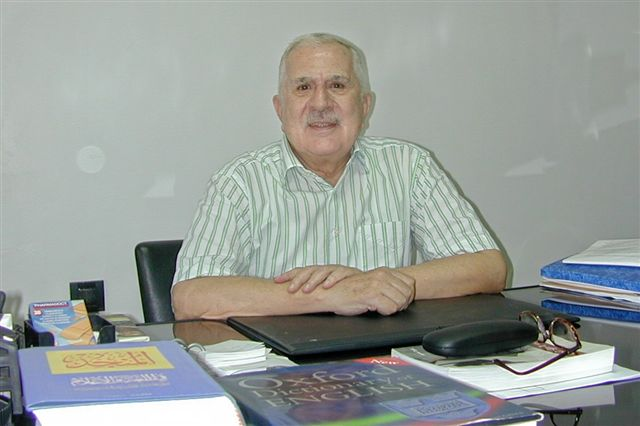
- Salibi in April 2009
- Born: Kamal Suleiman Salibi; 2 May 1929; Beirut, Lebanon
- Died: 1 September 2011 (aged 82); Beirut, Lebanon
- Occupations: Historian, academic, researcher

Kamal Suleiman Salibi (Arabic: كمال سليمان الصليبي) (2 May 1929 – 1 September 2011) was a Lebanese historian, professor of history at the American University of Beirut (AUB) and the founding Director (later Honorary President) of the Royal Institute for Inter-Faith Studies in Amman, Jordan.

== Career ==
Born to a Protestant family in Beirut, Salibi's family came from the Lebanese village of Bhamdoun in French Mandatory Lebanon. After studying at French missionary schools in Bhamdoun and Broummana, he completed his secondary education at the Prep School in Beirut (now International College), and his BA in History and Political Science from AUB, before moving to the School of Oriental and African Studies, SOAS (University of London) where he earned his PhD in history in 1953 under the supervision of historian Bernard Lewis. His dissertation was subsequently published under the title Maronite Historians of Mediaeval Lebanon.

After his graduation from SOAS, Salibi joined AUB as bibliographer of the Arab Studies Program. He then became professor in the Department of History and Archaeology where he joined other prominent and already established historians such as Nicholas Ziadeh and Zein Zein. In 1965, he published The Modern History of Lebanon, which was subsequently translated into Arabic, Russian, and French.

In 1982 Salibi finalised his book, The Bible Came from Arabia, during the Israeli invasion of Lebanon. It was translated into German at the same time as the original English version was being published in London. Salibi wrote subsequent works on biblical issues using the same etymological and geographic methodology. Some of his books are today considered classics, notably A House of Many Mansions: The History of Lebanon Reconsidered (1988) and The Modern History of Jordan (1993). In 1994, Salibi helped found the Royal Institute for Inter-Faith Studies in Amman, Jordan, and became its director from 1997 until 2004, following his retirement from AUB. He was associated as a consultant with the Druze Heritage Foundation. He retired from the Department of History and Archeology at the American University of Beirut in 1998, and became professor emeritus. He moved to Amman in the early 1990s and became director of the Institute for Interfaith Studies there from 1994 to 2003. He believed Lebanon's Christian community had an important role to play in building a Lebanon distinct from its Islamic ambiance, but did not share the fanaticism about Lebanon's Christian nature shown by many of his Maronite colleagues. He dismantled the foundational myths which many of Lebanon's communities were attached to, and replaced them with a complex portrait of the nation as an intricate mosaic of disparate but interconnected communities, over which no one group exerted dominance. He was strongly opposed to sectarian politics, believing that it had been the ruin of his country, and was one of the first Lebanese to remove his religious denomination (math-hab) from the Lebanese census records. He pinned a copy of his new ID, which has 'I' for his math-hab outside his apartment in Ras Beirut.

He was a lifetime bachelor, who devoted his life to books.

== Arabian Judah theory ==
Kamal Salibi wrote three books advocating the controversial "Israel in Arabia" theory. In this view, the place names of the Hebrew Bible actually allude to places in southwest Arabia. As the Arabian Hebrews migrated and many resettled in Palestine where they established the Hasmonean kingdom under Simon Maccabaeus in the second century B.C.. According to the theory, the place names in the Bible were gradually reinterpreted to refer to places in this new region. In this new Israel, the Jewish peoples switched from Hebrew to Aramaic. It was this switch in language that created the confusions which led to the distortion of the immigrants' stories. He also argued that 'Lebanon' itself in high antiquity was a place in the Southern Arabian peninsula.

His theory has been both attacked and supported for its supposed implications for modern political affairs, although Salibi himself made no such connection. Tudor Parfitt wrote "It is dangerous because Salibi's ideas have all sorts of implications, not least in terms of the legitimacy of the State of Israel".

The (literally) central identification of the theory is that the geographical feature referred to as הירדן, the "Jordan", which is usually taken to refer to the Jordan River, although never actually described as a "river" in the Hebrew text, actually means the great West Arabian Escarpment, known as the Sarawat Mountains. The area of ancient Israel is then identified with the land on either side of the southern section of the escarpment that is the southern Hejaz and 'Asir, from Ta’if down to the border with Yemen.

Salibi argued that early epigraphic evidence used to vindicate the Biblical stories has been misread. Mesha, the Moabite ruler who celebrated a victory over the kingdom of Israel in a stone inscription, the Mesha stele found in 1868, was, according to Salibi, an Arabian, and Moab was a village 'south (yemen) of Rabin' near Mecca. The words translated 'many days' actually meant 'south of Rabin'. He shared the view of such scholars as Thomas L. Thompson that there is a severe mismatch between the Biblical narrative and the archaeological findings in Palestine. Thompson's explanation was to discount the Bible as literal history but Salibi's was to locate the centre of Jewish culture further south.

The location of the Promised Land is discussed in chapter 15 of "The Bible Came from Arabia". Salibi argued that the description in the Bible is of an extensive tract of land, substantially larger than Palestine which includes a very varied landscape, ranging from well-watered mountain-tops via fertile valleys and foothills to lowland deserts. In the southern part of Arabia there are recently-active volcanoes, near to which are, presumably, the buried remains of Sodom and Gomorrah.

The theory is considered to be a fringe theory. According to Itamar Rabinowitz, the theory allegedly embarrassed many of his colleagues. Rabinowitz discounts antisemitism as the impetus for the book because Salibi "was not a sworn enemy of Israel or Zionism." He speculates, however, that it might've been "an intellectual exercise" for Salibi, whom he considers a "top historian." Several academic reviewers criticised Cape for having accepted "The Bible Came from Arabia" for publication.

== Works ==
- Maronite Historians of Mediaeval Lebanon, Beirut, AUB Oriental Series 34, 1959
- The Modern History of Lebanon, London, Weidenfeld & Nicolson, 1965
- Crossroads to Civil War, Lebanon 1958-1976, Beirut, Caravan Books, 1976
- Syria under Islam: Empire on Trial 634-1097, Beirut, Caravan Books, 1977
- A History of Arabia, Beirut, Caravan Books, 1980
- The Bible Came from Arabia, London, Jonathan Cape, 1985
- Secrets of the Bible People, London, Saqi Books, 1988
- Who Was Jesus?: Conspiracy in Jerusalem, London, I.B. Tauris, 1988
- A House of Many Mansions: The History of Lebanon Reconsidered, London, I.B. Tauris, 1988
- The Historicity of Biblical Israel, London, NABU Publications, 1998
- The Historicity of Biblical Israel (second edition), Beirut, Dar Nelson, 2009
- The Modern History of Jordan, London, I.B. Tauris, 1993
- A Bird on an Oak Tree (Arabic طائر على سنديانة), Amman, Ashshoroq Publishers, 2002

== Other references ==
- Biella, Joan (2004) Dictionary of Old South Arabian – Sabaean Dialect Eisenbrauns, Winola Lake, Indiana, US
- Hubbard, David (1956) The Literary Sources of the Kebra Nagast PhD dissertation., St.Andrews University, Scotland
- Leslau, Wolf (1991) Comparative Dictionary of Ge’ez Otto Harrassowitz, Wiesbaden, Germany
- Rabin, Chaim (1951) Ancient West Arabian London: Taylor's Foreign Press
- Savoie, Denis (2009), Sundials: Design, Construction, and Use Springer Praxis, ISBN 978-0-387-09801-2 (see pp. 163–164)
- Schneider, Roger (1973) Deux inscriptions subarabiques du Tigre. Leiden, Netherlands: Bibliotheca Orientalis, 30, 1973, 385-387
- Ullendorff, Edward (1956) Hebraic Jewish Elements in Abyssinian (Monophysite) Christianity in Journal of Semitic Studies, 1, no.3, 216-256
- Ullendorff, Edward (1960) The Ethiopians London: Oxford University Press
- Ullendorff, Edward (1968) Ethiopia and the Bible London: Oxford University Press
