= Maghen Abraham =

Maghen Abraham may refer to:

- Congregation Maghen Abraham (Montreal)
- Maghen Abraham Synagogue, in Beirut, Lebanon

== See also ==
- Magen Abraham (disambiguation)
