= Deir el Qamar Synagogue =

Former synagogue in Lebanon

- Arabic: كنيس دير القمر
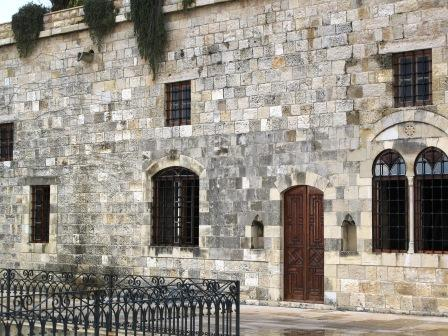
- The former synagogue in 2007

- Location of the former synagogue in Lebanon

Religion
- Affiliation: Judaism (former)
- Rite: Nusach Sefard
- Ecclesiastical or organisational status: Synagogue (1638–2016)
- Status: Inactive (maybe temporary)

Location
- Location: Deir el Qamar, Chouf
- Country: Lebanon
- Coordinates: 33°41′52″N 35°33′48″E

Architecture
- Completed: 1638
- Materials: Stone

The Deir el Qamar Synagogue (Arabic: كنيس دير القمر) is a former synagogue, located in Deir el Qamar, a village in south-central Lebanon. Completed in the 17th century during the Ottoman era, the synagogue is the oldest synagogue in Mount Lebanon. The synagogue served the local Jewish population, some of whom were part of the immediate entourage of Fakhr al-Din II.

The synagogue remained under Jewish ownership even after the dispersal of the local Jewish community in the aftermath of the sectarian conflict in Mount Lebanon in 1860. However, it was eventually sold in 1893, contrary to the counsel of the sages of Jerusalem, who advised against its sale unless for the construction of a new synagogue.

As of 2016, the synagogue was in excellent condition. Subsequently, the synagogue was closed to the public for security reasons and was entrusted to the French cultural center by Lebanon's Direction Générale des Antiquités, translated as the General Directorate of Antiquities.

== See also ==
- Jewish Cemetery (Beirut)
- History of the Jews in Lebanon
- List of synagogues in Lebanon
