= History of the Jews in Lebanon =

Lebanese Jews
اليهود اللبنانيون יהודים לבנונים
- Location of Lebanon in Asia

Total population
- Lebanon: 29 (2020); 27 to 20 (2022); Diaspora: Several thousands (Note: Several thousand emigrants and their descendants outside of Lebanon in Israel, Brazil, Argentina, France, Canada, Switzerland and United States.)

Regions with significant populations
- Beirut, Tripoli and Aley

Languages
- Hebrew, Lebanese Arabic, French

Religion
- Judaism

Related ethnic groups
- Mizrahi Jews, Sephardi Jews

The history of the Jews in Lebanon refers to the presence of Jews in Lebanon since biblical times. The number of Jews living in Lebanon dwindled during the Muslim era. However, despite persecution, the community retained its religious and cultural identity.

In the early 20th century, for a brief period under the French Mandate of Lebanon and 1926 Constitution of Lebanon, the Jewish community was constitutionally protected. However, after 1948, the security of Jews remained fragile, and the main synagogue in Beirut was bombed in the early 1950s.

In the wake of the 1967 Arab–Israeli War, there was mass emigration of around 6,000 Lebanese Jews from Lebanon to Israel and Western countries.

During the Lebanese Civil War, some 200 members of the community were killed in anti-Jewish pogroms, and over 1,800 displaced. In August 1982, when Israeli forces invaded Lebanon and lay siege to Beirut, over 100 Jewish families were displaced and the synagogue suffered extensive damage. By 2005, the number of Jews living in the Jewish quarter of Beirut, Wadi Abu Jamil, was said to be 40-200.

The Jews were officially called Israelites or Mousawiyyin (followers of Moses). While there are no official estimates for the size of the remaining Jewish community today, it is estimated that there are only 70–100 Jews left, and most remain under the radar for fear of persecution.

== History ==
=== Antiquity ===
In Late Antiquity (the Talmudic period in Jewish historiography), Jewish sages, chazal, are recorded as having traveled from the Land of Israel to Tyre, where they taught halakha (Jewish law), answered halakhic questions, and provided biblical commentary. Rabbinic traditions reference the activities of Yaakov of Kfar Naboria, a sage from the fourth generation of the amoraim, in Tyre.

Another notable amora active in Tyre was R. Mana bar Tanchum. According to the Talmud, "Hiyya bar Abba went to Tyre and discovered that R. Mana bar Tanchum permitted Turmusin (Lupin beans)." Rabbi Simeon bar Yochai identified two routes that could be traveled on Shabbat without crossing the Shabbat techum: from Tiberias to Sepphoris (in Israel) and from Tyre to Sidon (in Lebanon).

Evidence of Jewish migration from Tyre to Galilee is found in a Greek-language inscription on a stone lintel at a synagogue in Sepphoris, likely dating to the fifth century CE. The inscription references the archisynagogos of Tyre and Sidon, implying that Jews from both Tyre and Sidon had settled in Sepphoris, establishing a community centered around the local synagogue, complete with its own leaders.

=== Middle Ages ===
As governor of Syria under Caliph 'Uthman from 639 to 661 CE, Mu'awiya settled Jews in Tripoli.

During the early Islamic period, Tyre was home to a substantial Jewish population (estimated at around 4,000 prior to the Arab conquest) and benefited from the Mu'āwiya’s redevelopment of coastal cities. In the 11th century, Tyre's economic and Jewish communal significance grew, particularly with the temporary relocation of the Land of Israel yeshiva to the city between roughly 1077 and 1093.

Regional instability under the Fatimid Caliphate, including a failed rebellion in 1063 and the sack of Tyre in 1093, led to a period of destruction in the city. The Damascus Jewish community ransomed captives from Tyre in the aftermath. Tyre remained a Jewish center during the Crusader period, with Benjamin of Tudela reporting 400–500 Jewish households, a number of synagogues, and a scholarly community. The Jewish presence largely ended with the Mamluk conquest in 1291, after which Tyre declined and became a secondary stop for pilgrims.

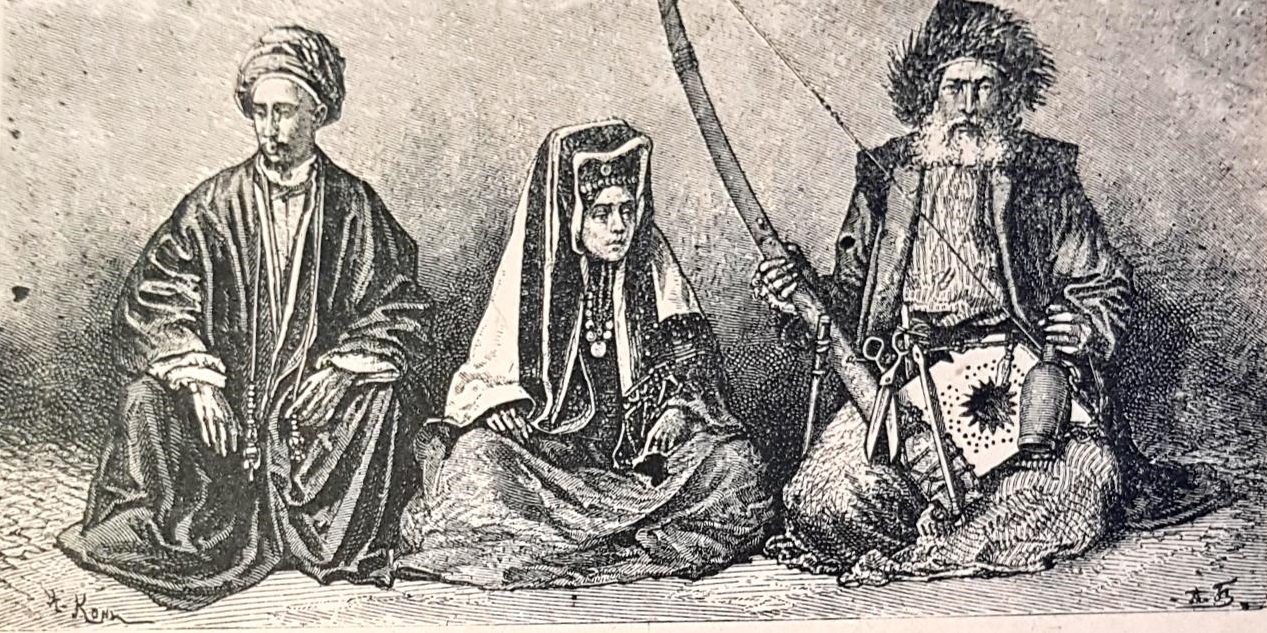
Beiruti Jews in the 19th century

=== Ottoman period ===
During the Ottoman period, Deir al-Qamar hosted a Jewish community. It was first documented in Rabbi Joseph Soffer's visit circa 1759. The community is cited in Responsa literature from the same period, indicating it had communal institutions such as a beth din and synagogue. Rabbi Joseph Schwartz provides additional context, estimating the community at 80 householders mostly engaged in trade, also leasing lands for iron production and owning vineyards and olive plantations.

Following hardships in the late 19th century, the Jewish community of Deir al-Qamar dispersed, selling their properties. In the 1837 Safed earthquake, the Jews of Deir al-Qamar aided the Jews of Safed. In 1847, they faced a blood libel incident. The community's demise came during the 1860 civil conflict in Mount Lebanon, leading to their displacement and the eventual sale of their synagogue in 1893.

=== Early 20th century ===
In 1911, Jews from Italy, Greece, Syria, Iraq, Turkey, Egypt and Iran moved to Beirut, expanding the community there with more than 5,000 additional members. Articles 9 and 10 of the 1926 Constitution of Lebanon guaranteed the freedom of religion and provided each religious community, including the Jewish community, the right to manage its own civil matters, including education, and thus the Jewish community was constitutionally protected, a fact that did not apply to other Jewish communities in the region. The Jewish community prospered under the French mandate and Greater Lebanon, exerting considerable influence throughout Lebanon and beyond. They allied themselves with Pierre Gemayel's Phalangist Party (a right wing, Maronite group modelled after similar movements in Italy and Germany, and Franco's Phalangist movement in Spain.) and played an instrumental role in the establishment of Lebanon as an independent state.

During the Greater Lebanon period, two Jewish newspapers were founded, the Arabic language Al-Alam al-Israili (the Israelite World) and the French language Le Commerce du Levant, an economic periodical which continued to be in circulation until June 2021.

The Jewish community of Beirut evolved in three distinct phases. Until 1908, the Jewish population in Beirut grew by migration from the Syrian interior and from other Ottoman cities like İzmir, Salonica, Istanbul, and Baghdad. Commercial growth in the thriving port-city, consular protection, and relative safety and stability in Beirut all accounted for the Jewish migration. Thus, from a few hundred at the beginning of the 19th century, the Jewish community grew to 2,500 by the end of the century, and to 3,500 by World War I. While the number of Jews grew considerably, the community remained largely unorganized. During this period, the community lacked some of the fundamental institutions such as communal statutes, elected council, welfare and taxation mechanisms. In this period, the most organized and well-known Jewish institution in the city was probably the private Tiferet Israel (The Glory of Israel) boarding-school founded by Zaki Cohen in 1874. The school attracted Jewish students from prosperous families like Shloush (Jaffa), Moyal (Jaffa), and Sassoon (Baghdad). Its founder, influenced by the Ottoman reforms and by local cultural trends, aspired to create a modern yet Jewish school. It offered both secular and strictly Jewish subjects as well as seven languages. It also offered commercial subjects. The school was closed at the beginning of the 20th century due to financial hardships.

In the center of the photo, Deir el Qamar Synagogue, dating from the seventeenth century, abandoned but still intact.

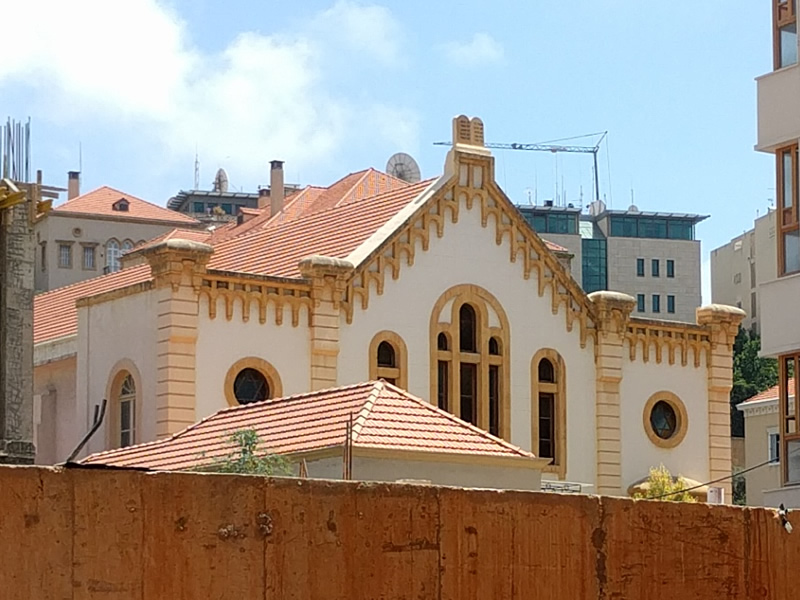
Maghen Abraham Synagogue in Beirut, Lebanon.

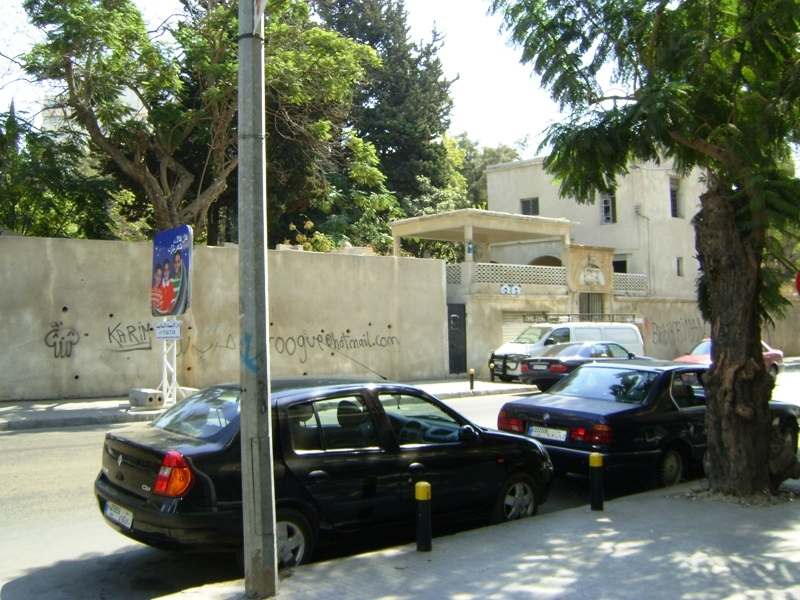
The Jewish Cemetery in Beirut (2008).

The Young Turk Revolution (1908) sparked the organization process. Within six years, the Beirut community created a general assembly, an elected twelve-member council, drafted communal statutes, appointed a chief rabbi, and appointed committees to administer taxation and education. The process involved tension and even conflicts within the community, but eventually, the community council established its rule and authority in the community. The chief rabbi received his salary from the community and was de facto under the council's authority.

With the establishment of Greater Lebanon (1920), the Jewish community of Beirut became part of a new political entity. The French mandate rulers adopted local political traditions of power-sharing and recognized the autonomy of the various religious communities. Thus, the Jewish community was one of Lebanon's sixteen communities and enjoyed a large measure of autonomy, more or less along the lines of the Ottoman millet system. During the third phase of its development, the community founded two major institutions: the Maghen Abraham Synagogue (1926), and the renewed Talmud-Torah Selim Tarrab community school (1927). The community also maintained welfare services like the Biqur-Holim, Ozer-Dalim, and Mattan-Basseter societies. The funding for all these institutions came from contributions of able community members, who contributed on Jewish holidays and celebrations, through subscription of prominent members, fund-raising events and lotteries the community organized. In fact, the community was financially independent and did not rely on European Jewish philanthropy.

The development of the Jewish yishuv in Palestine influenced the Jewish leadership, who usually showed sympathy and active support for Zionism. The Jewish leadership in Beirut during this time aligned itself ideologically with the American-Based B'nai B'rith organization through its local proxy (Arzei Ha-Levanon Lodge) which was staffed by local community leaders. The B'nai B'rith lodge in Beirut attracted the social and economic elite. It embarked on community progress and revival through social activism, Jewish solidarity, and philanthropic values. Unlike the Alliance, who mainly aspired to empower the Jewish individual through modern education, the B'nai B'rith strove to empower both the individual and the community as a whole. In Beirut, unlike other Jewish communities, most of the community council members were also B'nai B'rith members, hence there existed an overlap between the council and the lodge. Of course, the Alliance school was popular in the community as it focused on French and prepared students for higher education. Since there was no Jewish high school in Beirut, many Jewish students attended foreign (Christian) schools, either secular or religious. The Jewish community was one of the smaller communities in the country, and hence it was not entitled for a guaranteed representation in the parliament. Being excluded from Lebanese political life, the Jewish leadership aspired to improve the community's public standing by consolidating and improving the community as a whole. Overall, the French mandate period was characterized by growth, development, and stability.

In the 20th century, the Jewish community in Lebanon showed little involvement or interest in politics. They were generally traditional as opposed to religious and were not involved in the feuds of the larger religious groups in the country. Broadly speaking, they tended to support Lebanese nationalism and felt an affinity toward France. French authorities at the time discouraged expressions of Zionism (which they saw as a tool of their British rival), and the community was mostly apathetic to it. A few community leaders, such as Joseph Farhi, fervently supported the Zionist cause, and there was a level of support for the concept of a Jewish state in Palestine. The Jews in Lebanon had good contacts with those in Palestine, and there were regular visits between Beirut and Jerusalem. Accounts by the Alliance Israélite Universelle, which established schools that most Jewish children in the country attended, spoke of active Zionism while the Jewish Agency lamented the lack of national sentiment. The World Zionist Organization was also disappointed with the lack of more active support, and the community did not send a delegation to the World Zionist Congress.

A young Lebanese Jew named Joseph Azar, who took it upon himself to advance the Zionist cause with other individuals in October 1930, said in a report for the Jewish Agency that: "Before the disturbance of August 1929 the Jews...of Lebanon manifested much sympathy for the Zionist cause and worked actively for the sake of Palestine. They had established associations which collected money for (sic) Keren Kayemeth and (sic) Keren Heyesod." He said that after 1929, the Jews "started to fear from (sic) anything having any connection with Zionism and ceased to hold meetings and collect money." He also said that the Jewish Communal Council in Beirut "endeavored to prevent anything having a Jewish national aspect because they feared that this might wound the feelings of the Muslims." Other sources suggested that such charity work was not so much motivated by Zionism as it was by an interest to help Jews in need.

The Maccabi organization was recognized officially by Lebanese authorities and was an active center for Jewish cultural affairs in Beirut and Saida. The Maccabi taught Hebrew language and Jewish history, and was the focus point of the small Zionist movement in the country. There was also a pro-Zionist element within the Maronite community in Lebanon.

After the 1929 riots in Jerusalem, the Grand Mufti of Jerusalem was expelled from Palestine and he chose to settle in Lebanon, where continued to mobilize resistance against Zionist claims to Palestine. During the riots, some Muslim nationalists and editors of a major Greek-Orthodox newspaper (both of whom saw the fate of the emerging Lebanese state as one within a broader Arab context) sought to incite the disturbances in Lebanon, where until that point most ethno-religious groups were aloof to the forecoming conflict in Palestine. It also seemed to have an effect on the cryptic response given by Interior Minister Habib Abou Chahla to Joseph Farhi when, on behalf of the Jewish community, he requested that they receive a seat in the newly expanded Lebanese Parliament.

Outside of Beirut, the attitudes toward Jews were usually more hostile. In November 1945, fourteen Jews were killed in anti-Jewish riots in Tripoli. Further anti-Jewish events occurred in 1948 following the 1948 Arab–Israeli War. The ongoing insecurity combined with the greater opportunities that Beirut offered prompted most of the remaining Jews of Tripoli to relocate to Beirut.

=== 1947 onward ===
The Jewish community was traditionally located in Wadi Abu Jamil and Ras Beirut, with other communities in Chouf, Deir al-Qamar, Aley, Bhamdoun, and Hasbaya.

Lebanon was the only Arab country whose Jewish population increased after the declaration of the State of Israel in 1948, reaching around 10,000 people. However, after the Lebanon Crisis of 1958, many Lebanese Jews left the country, especially for Israel, France, United States, Canada and Latin America (mostly to Brazil).

The main synagogue in Beirut was bombed in the early 1950s, and the Lebanese Chamber of Deputies witnessed heated debates on the status of Lebanese Jewish army officers. The discussions culminated in a unanimous resolution to expel and exclude them from the Lebanese Army. The two Jewish army officers were discharged, but a few Jews continued to work for the government. The Jewish population of Beirut, which stood at 9,000 in 1948, dwindled to 2,500 by 1969.

==== 1975-76 anti-Jewish pogroms in Lebanon ====
The Lebanese Civil War, which started in 1975, was much worse for the Lebanese Jewish community, and some 200 were killed in pogroms. Most of the 1,800 remaining Lebanese Jews migrated in 1976, fearing that the growing Syrian presence in Lebanon would restrict their freedom to emigrate. Beginning in 1975 and 1976, Jews began to leave their original neighborhood of Wadi Abu Jamil for Christian areas. In the 1970s and 1980s, Jews largely lived in relative harmony in their environment, though the last rabbi remaining in Lebanon left the country in 1977.

In 1982, during the 1982 Israeli invasion of Lebanon, 11 leaders of the Jewish community were captured and killed by Islamic extremists. The community buildings also suffered during those days. During the Israeli Army's advance toward Beirut, Yasser Arafat assigned Palestinian gunmen to stand guard at the Maghen Abraham Synagogue, an important symbol of the community, located near Parliament. The synagogue was bombarded by the Israeli Air Force, perhaps on the presumption that it was being used as a weapons depot by Palestinians. During the Israeli invasion, some of the Lebanese Jews who had emigrated to Israel returned as invading troops.

Jews were targeted in the later years of the Lebanese civil war. Isaac Sasson, a leader of the Lebanese Jewish community, was kidnapped at gunpoint March 31, 1985, on his way from the Beirut International Airport, after a trip to Abu Dhabi. Earlier, kidnappers had also seized Eli Hallak, 60-year-old physician; Haim Cohen, a 39-year-old Jew; Isaac Tarrab; Yeheda Benesti; Salim Jammous; and Elie Srour. Cohen, Tarrab, and Srour were killed by their captors, a Shiite Muslim group called The Organization of the Oppressed on Earth, which is believed to have been part of or had links to Hezbollah. The others' fates remain unknown, but they are believed to have also been killed.

1982 war with Israel further reduced the number of Jews in the country. Much of the emigration was to countries with existing well-established Lebanese or Lebanese Jewish diaspora communities, such as Brazil, France, Switzerland, Canada and the United States.

=== 21st century ===
Almost all Lebanese Jews had fled the country by 2005, and the Jewish quarter of Beirut, Wadi Abu Jamil, was virtually abandoned after the assassination of Prime Minister Rafik Hariri. In 2005, there were only around 40 Jews left in Beirut, mostly elderly. In 2006, there were only about 40 Jews left in Lebanon.

In 2010, work began to restore an old synagogue in Beirut, the Maghen Abraham Synagogue, as the synagogue had fallen into disrepair several years earlier. Solidere agreed to provide funds for the renovation because political officials believed it would portray Lebanon as an open society tolerant of Judaism. None of the Jews involved in the project agreed to be identified. The international media and even some members of the Jewish community (in and out of Lebanon) questioned who would pray at the synagogue. The decision received acclaim from both the Sunni and Shi'ite Muslims. Hezbollah leader Hassan Nasrallah welcomed the authority's decision of restoring the synagogue. The self-declared head of the Jewish Community Council, Isaac Arazi, who left Lebanon in 1983, eventually came forward but refused to show his face on camera in a television interview, fearing that his business would suffer if clients knew they had been dealing with a Jew. Arazi died in 2023.

Jews in Lebanon live mostly in or around Beirut. The community has been described as elderly and apprehensive. There are no services at Beirut's synagogues. In 2015, the estimated total Jewish population in Syria and Lebanon combined was 100. In 2020, there were only about 29 Jews in Lebanon. In 2022, there were 4,500 Jews registered on election rolls, but the majority had died or had left the country. Only 27 people were registered as "Israelites", the designation for Jews in official registers. Out of fear and weariness, most signs of Jewish life in Lebanon had fallen into disuse by 2022, with synagogues deserted, Magen Davids removed, Jewish cemeteries abandoned. Jews largely hide their identity. In Saida, where Jews have had a presence since the first century BC, there is no indication of a Jewish presence. The country still hosts a few buildings that were originally synagogues, such as one located in Tripoli and another in the southern city of Sidon.

== Lebanese Jewish-born notables ==
- Jack Benaroya – philanthropist and civic leader
- John Grabow – Major League Baseball player
- Adriana Behar – Olympic medalist in beach volleyball
- Joseph Safra – Brazilian Banker
- Sasson Dayan – Brazilian Banker
- Michael Netzer – comic book writer
- Ezra Nahmad – art collector
- Ariel Helwani – MMA journalist
- Neil Sedaka – singer
- Edgar de Picciotto – banker in Geneva
- Gad Saad – evolutionary psychologist
- Justin Hurwitz – Oscar-winning musical composer
- Michael Benaroya – movie producer
- Caroline Aaron – American actress
- Yfrah Neaman – British violinist
- Yuval Noah Harari – historian and philosopher
- Lolita Chammah – French actress
- Bob Dishy – American actor
- Esther Moyal – writer
- Gad Lerner – journalist and TV presenter
- Jose Maria Benegas – politician
- Joanna Hausmann – comedian
- Ana María Shua – Argentinian writer
- Mishael Cheshin – judge in the Israeli Supreme court
- Heiny Srour – Lebanese Film Film director

== Jewish community presidents ==
The Jewish community presidents include:

- Ezra Anzarut prior to 1910
- Joseph. D. Farhi 1910–1924
- Joseph Dichy Bey 1925–1927
- Joseph D. Farhi 1928–1930
- Selim Harari 1931–1934
- Joseph D. Farhi 1935–1938
- Deab Saadia & Joseph Dichy Bey 1939–1950
- Joseph Attiyeh 1950–1976
- Isaac Sasson 1977–1985
- Raoul Mizrahi 1985
- Joseph Mizrahi 1986–2003
- Isaac Arazi 2005–2023

== Jewish community vice presidents ==
- Joseph Balayla 1926–1931 (was also the treasurer of the community)
- Yaakov (Jackes) Balayla 1931–1934 (Jackes and Joseph Balayla were brothers)
- Ezra Cohen 1962–1975
- Semo Bechar 2005–present

== Chief rabbis ==
Between the years of 1799 and 1978, a series of Chief Rabbis led the Lebanese Jewish community.

- Rabbi Moïse Yedid-Levy 1799–1829
- Rabbi Ralph Alfandari
- Rabbi Youssef Mann
- Rabbi Aharoun Yedid-Levy
- Rabbi Zaki Cohen 1875
- Rabbi Menaché Ezra Sutton
- Rabbi Jacob Bukai
- Rabbi Haïm Dana
- Rabbi Moïse Yedid-Levy
- Rabbi Nassim Afandi Danon 1908–1909
- Rabbi Jacob Tarrab 1910–1921
- Rabbi Salomon Tagger 1921–1923
- Rabbi Shabtai Bahbouth 1924–1950
- Rabbi Benzion Lichtman 1932–1959
- Rabbi Jacob Attiyeh 1949–1966
- Rabbi Shaul Chreim 1960–1978

== See also ==
- Wadi Abu Jamil (Jewish Quarter of Beirut)
- Deir el Qamar Synagogue (Chouf, Lebanon)
- Maghen Abraham Synagogue (Beirut, Lebanon)
- Bhamdoun Synagogue (Aley, Lebanon)
- Sidon Synagogue (Sidon, Lebanon)
- Beth Elamen Cemetery
- Zaki Cohen, Beirut Chief Rabbi
- Jewish Migration from Lebanon Post-1948
- Jewish exodus from Arab lands
- Congregation Maghen Abraham (Montreal) (Montreal, Canada)
- Israel–Lebanon relations
- Religion in Lebanon
- Syrian Jews
