= Bhamdoun railway station =

Railway station in Lebanon

Bhamdoun
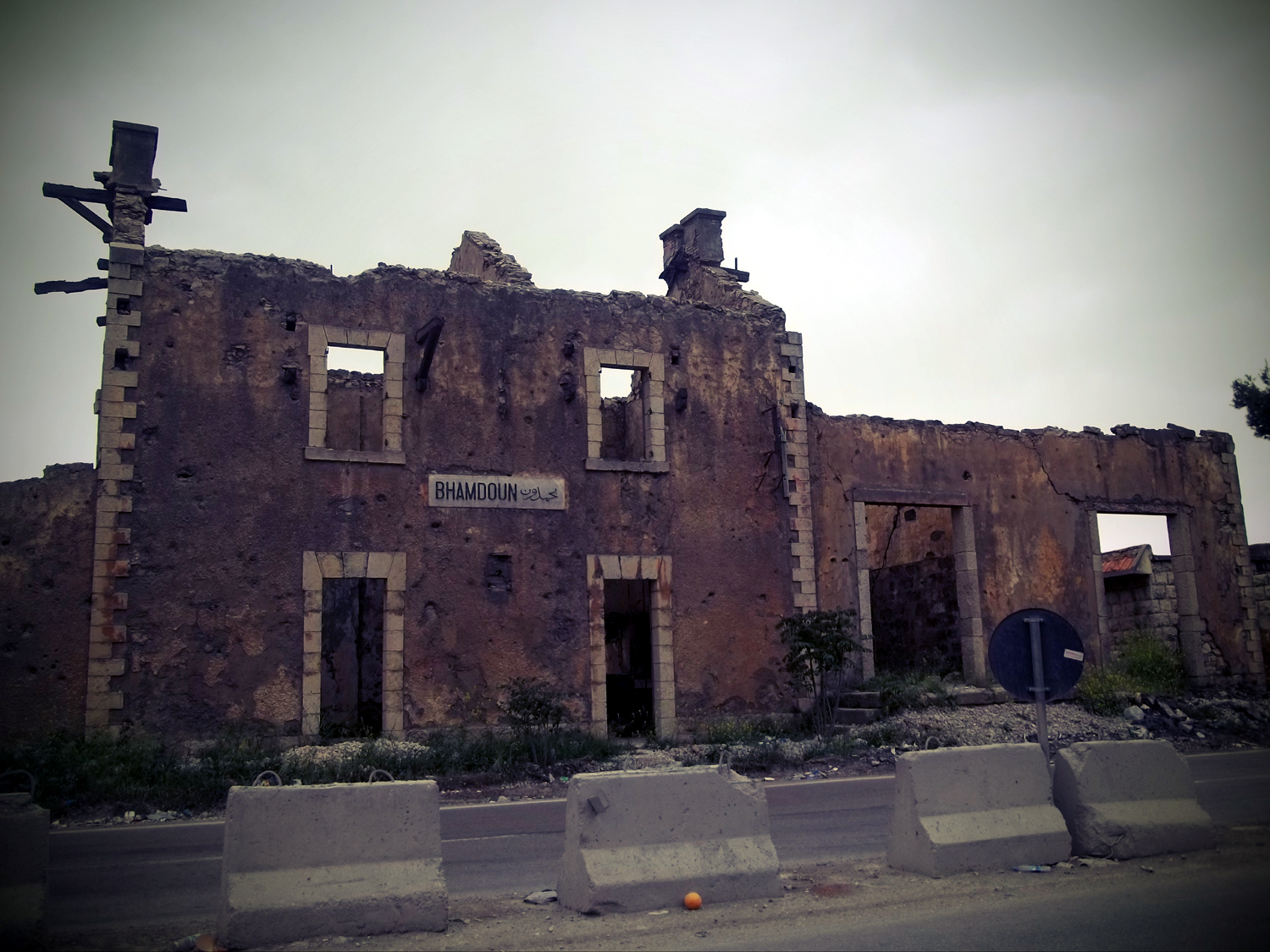
- The former station in 2012

General information
- Location: Lebanon

Construction
- Architectural style: French architectural style

History
- Opened: 1898
- Closed: 1983

The Bhamdoun Railway Station is a former passenger railway station, located in Bhamdoun, Lebanon. The station was opened under the Ottoman Empire and operated until Israeli invasion of the country in 1982, finally closing in 1983.

== Historical Information ==
The station was built in 1898 along the road to Damascus, in an area outside the village of Bhamdoun, eventually becoming the more prosperous of the two as residents moved closer to the train station. The building served a passageway on the local tram in addition to the railway. Eventually, business, restaurants and hotels opened around the railway station, in addition to mosques, churches and a synagogue. The locality eventually became known as "Bhamdoun Gare" (Bhamdoun Station) and would separate from the municipality of Bhamdoun Village, eventually becoming the more prosperous of the two locations.

The station was located in a former summer resort, along the rail line from Beirut to Damascus: "After descending through open country filled with flowers and pine trees, the train arrived at Bhamdoun". Once a bustling vacation resort served by the railway, bringing visitors from all over the region, the area was heavily involved in the fighting in the Mountain War between Druze and Christians in 1983.

There were plans discussed circa 2000 to rehabilitate the building for municipal use as a recreational complex, although nothing was to come of these plans. By 2016, the roof had fallen in, the doors and windows were empty holes and the walls were barely standing. The station building was being used as a storage area for construction crews building a highway in the area. One author in 2016 noted the building still had bullet holes from the Civil War in the country during the 1980s. The new highway passes right beside the former station building.
