= Sidon Synagogue =

Former synagogue in Lebanon

- Arabic: كنيس صيدا
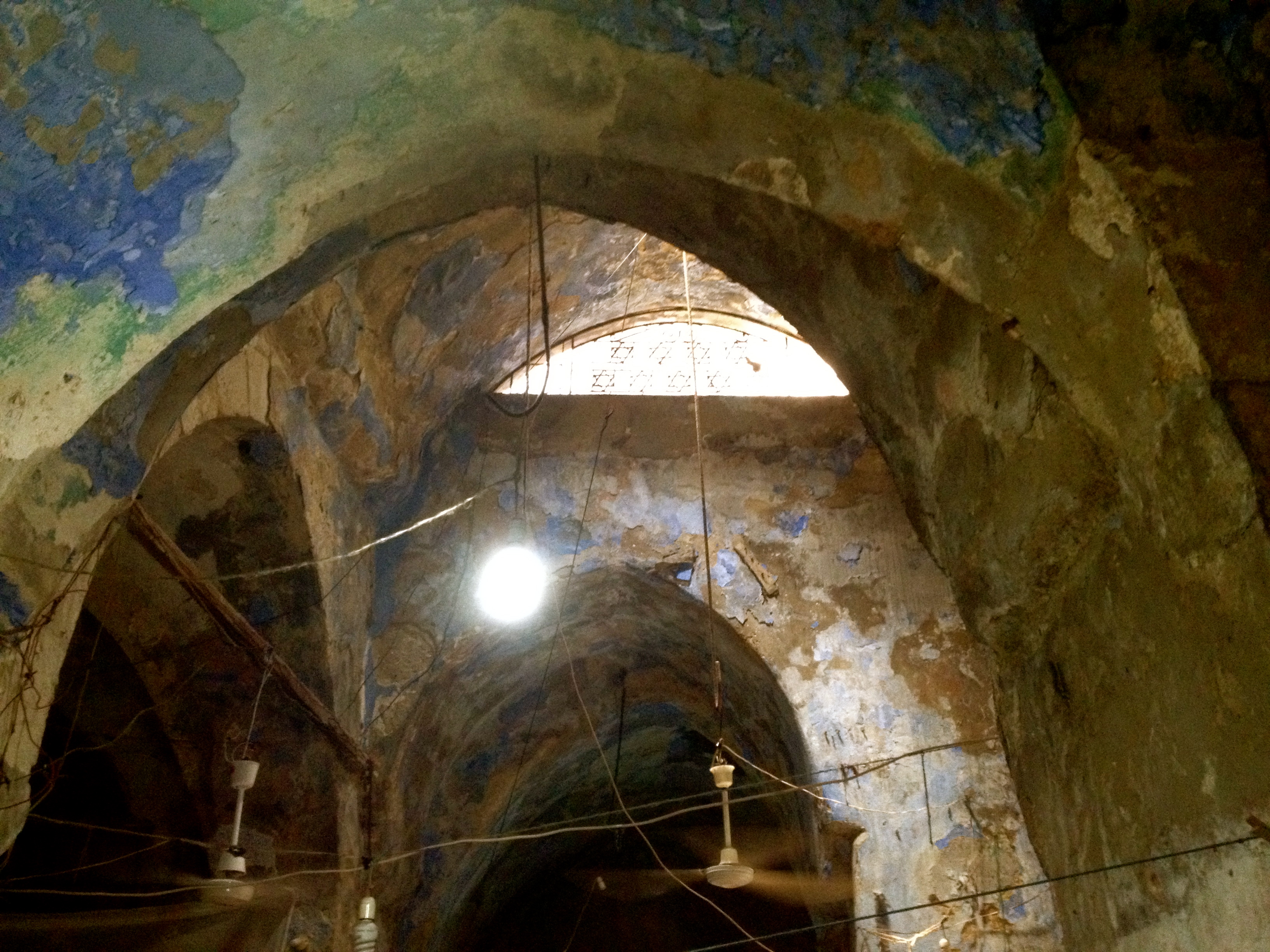
- Sidon Synagogue in 2012

- Location of the former synagogue in Lebanon

Religion
- Affiliation: Judaism (former)
- Rite: Nusach Edot HaMizrach
- Ecclesiastical or organizational status: Synagogue (833 CE–1975)
- Status: Abandoned

Location
- Location: Sidon, Sidon District
- Country: Lebanon
- Interactive map of Sidon Synagogue
- Coordinates: 33°33′38″N 35°23′53″E

Architecture
- Completed: 833 CE

The Sidon Synagogue (Arabic: كنيس صيدا) is a former Jewish congregation and synagogue, located in the old city of Sidon (Saida, Lebanon) in the Jewish neighborhood or quarter known colloquially as ḥarat al-yahūd (Arabic: حارة اليهود). The synagogue is one of the oldest synagogues in the world.

== History ==
Built in 833, it is believed to rest on an older synagogue which dates back to the destruction of the Second Temple in 66 AD. Jesus is said to have preached in it and in its vicinity as attested in Matthew (15:21) and Mark (7:24).

Although not big in size, it is considered one of the main synagogues in Lebanon, which includes the Maghen Abraham Synagogue in Beirut, completed in 1925.

In April 2012, prayers were said for the first time after decades of desuetude by two rabbis from the Neturei Karta International movement who were participating in a march to mark Land Day.

Many Lebanese Jews began to leave Sidon after the Lebanese Civil War began in 1975, which explains the synagogue's dilapidated state.

== See also ==
- History of the Jews in Lebanon
- List of synagogues in Lebanon
