= Safir Hotels & Resorts =

Safir Hotels & Resorts (also known as Safir International Hotels Management) is a Kuwaiti-owned luxury hotel chain in the Arabic world. Clientele includes the sister of the Emir of Kuwait who stayed in the hotel's $3000 a month apartments (as of 1991).

== Hotels ==
=== Algeria ===
Safir Mazafran is a hotel in Zeralda. It is said to "dominate the town" and has a restaurant serving Lebanese cuisine.

=== Egypt ===
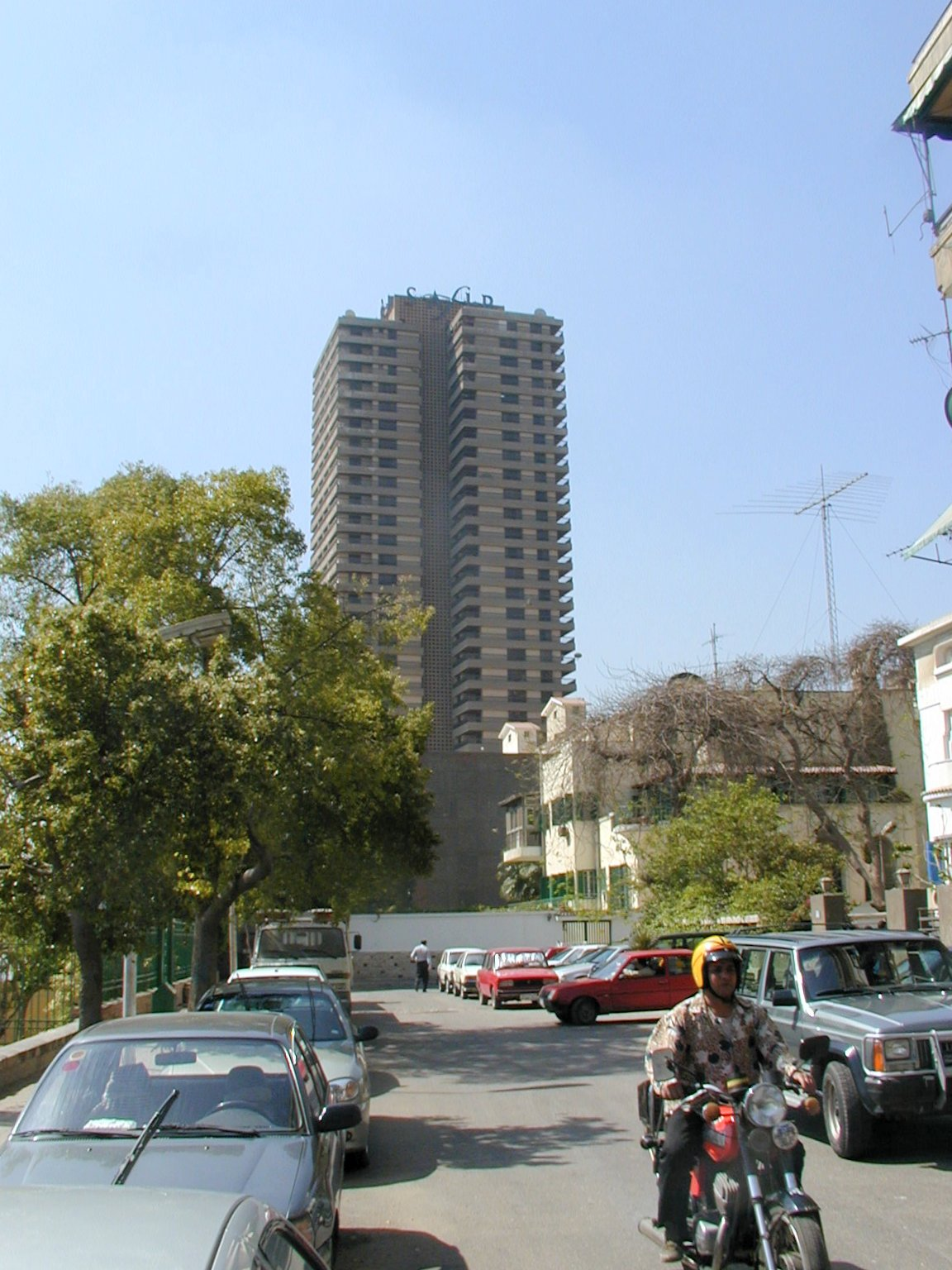
Safir Hotel, Cairo

Safir Hotel is a hotel in Zamalek, Cairo.

Safir Resort is a hotel and resort in Hurghada.

=== Kuwait ===
Safir International Hotel is a hotel in Bneid Al Gar.

Failaka Heritage Village is a hotel in Failaka Island. Completed in 2002, it has 50 chalets and 24 rooms. It is located in a Heritage Village which includes a children's zoo, lake, horse-riding and shwarma outlets and a golf course.

Safir Airport Hotel' is a hotel in Farwaniya.

Safir Hotel & Residences is a hotel in Fintas.

Marina Hotel is a hotel in Salmiya.

=== Lebanon ===
Safir Hotel Bhamdoun is a hotel in Bhamdoun. It has 68 rooms and suites.

Coordinates: 33.891458°N 35.472697°E

=== Qatar ===
Safir Doha is a hotel in Doha.

=== Syria ===
Safir Al Sayedah Zeinab is a hotel in Damascus.

Safir Hotel Homs is a hotel in Homs.
