= Jewish cemetery, Beirut =

Cemetery in Lebanon

Coordinates: 33°53′06.78″N 35°30′36.15″E

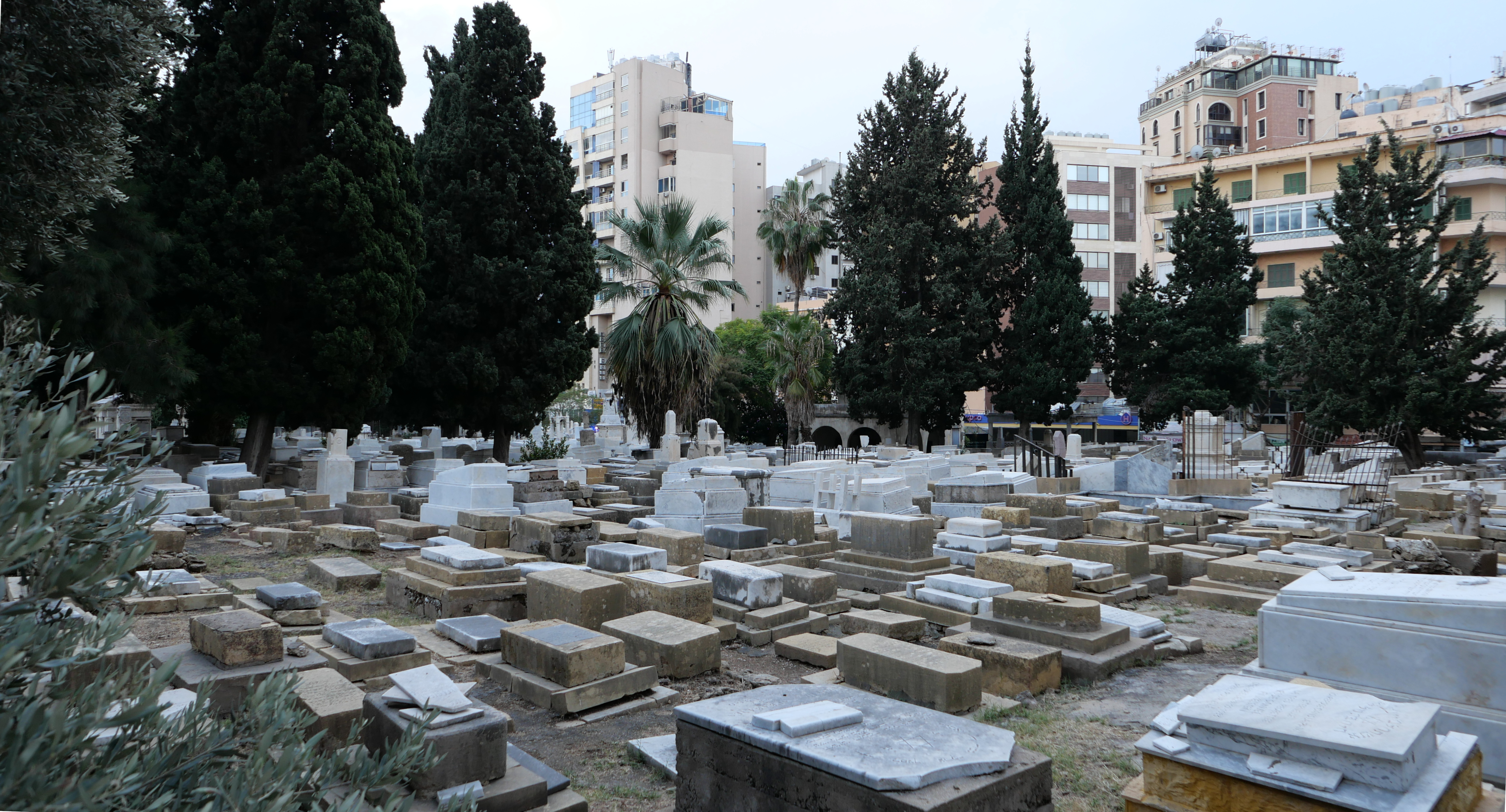
Panorama view in 2021

The Jewish cemetery of Beirut is the only Jewish cemetery in Lebanon's capital, Beirut.

== Location ==
The cemetery is located close to Sodeco Square in the Achrafieh district of Beirut and is accessible through a gate on Damascus Street, also known as Rue de Damas.

== History ==
The cemetery was established in 1829, when Rabbi Moïse Yedid Levy was the first person buried there. In the following two centuries, more than 3,000 Lebanese Jews were buried in the cemetery.

During the Lebanese Civil War (1975–1990), the cemetery was located at the Green Line, a demarcation line which separated the predominantly Muslim West Beirut from the predominantly Christian East Beirut. The cemetery was controlled by the far-right Phalanges of the Lebanese Front, who employed land mines to keep its enemies from crossing it. Several graves were hit and damaged by rockets and shells during the conflict, but it was never hit by desecration. After the war, the cemetery was de-mined by the Lebanese Armed Forces.

== See also ==
- History of the Jews in Lebanon
- Wadi Abu Jamil
- Maghen Abraham Synagogue
