= Bhamdoun synagogue =

Former synagogue in Lebanon

Bhamdoun Synagogue
- Location of the former synagogue in Lebanon

Religion
- Affiliation: Judaism (former)
- Rite: Mizrahi; Nusach Sefard
- Ecclesiastical or organisational status: Synagogue
- Governing body: Lebanese Jewish Community Council
- Leadership: Isaac Arazi
- Status: Abandoned

Location
- Location: Bhamdoun, Aley District
- Country: Lebanon
- Coordinates: 33°48′18″N 35°39′49″E

Architecture
- Completed: 1922

The Bhamdoun Synagogue is a former Jewish congregation and synagogue, that is located in Bhamdoun, in the Aley District of Lebanon. The synagogue was completed in 1922. It is one of the four big synagogues in Lebanon. Its structure still stands despite the building being abandoned.

== See also ==
- History of the Jews in Lebanon
- List of synagogues in Lebanon
