= Le Commerce du Levant =

Defunct business magazine in Lebanon

- Cover of Le Commerce du Levant (September 2014)
- Categories: Business magazine
- Frequency: Monthly
- Publisher: Société de presse et d’édition libanaise S.A.L.
- Founder: Toufic Mizrahi
- Founded: 1929
- Final issue: June 2021
- Country: Lebanon
- Based in: Beirut
- Language: French
- Website: Le Commerce du Levant

Le Commerce du Levant was a monthly economic magazine published in French language in Beirut, Lebanon, covering various aspect including economy, commerce, industry, tourism, banking and finance. It was in circulation between 1929 and 2021.

== History and profile ==
Le Commerce du Levant was established in 1929 by Lebanese Jews. It was headquartered in Beirut.The magazine was published monthly by Société de presse et d’édition libanaise S.A.L. that also publishes the French Lebanese daily L'Orient-Le Jour. It was formerly published on a weekly basis. Nayla de Freige was the president-director general of the publication.

The magazine published articles about business and commerce related to both Lebanon and the Middle East.

On 9 June 2021, the magazine announced that it would be shutting down its service, citing financial difficulties in the economic crisis. However, the real reason is believed to be due to the significant decline in readership. L'Orient le Jour, their sister site, would take in some of the staff.
