= Zaki Cohen =

Ottoman rabbi

Zaki Cohen (Arabic: زكي كوهن) born in 1829 in Aleppo in the Ottoman Empire, was a Chief Rabbi of the Jewish community in Beirut, Lebanon and a playwright. In 1874, he founded Beirut's first modern Jewish school, called Tiferet Yisrael ("Glory of Israel") in Hebrew and al-Madrasa al-Waṭaniyya al-Isrāʾīliyya ("The National Israeli School") in Arabic, where he served as director. The school continued to operate until 1899, when it was superseded by College Alliance Israelite Universelle of Beirut. Cohen died in Alexandria in 1904.

== Theatre ==
Cohen and his son Selim were among the leading Jewish playwrights active in Beirut in the late nineteenth century. While the others, including Selim Cohen, wrote in Arabic, Zaki Cohen wrote plays in Hebrew. In 1876 one of his works became the first play in Hebrew to be performed in Beirut.

At his school, Tiferet Yisrael, theatre was encouraged and two plays a year were normally staged.

== See also ==
- History of the Jews in Lebanon
- Maghen Abraham Synagogue
- Theatre of Lebanon
