= Magen Abraham =

Magen Abraham may refer to:

- Magen Abraham Synagogue, in Ahmedabad, India
- Avraham Gombiner, a 17th-century rabbi known as Magen Avraham

== See also ==
- Maghen Abraham (disambiguation)
