= Wadi Abu Jamil =

Former Jewish quarter in Beirut, Lebanon

Coordinates: 33°53′50″N 35°29′57″E

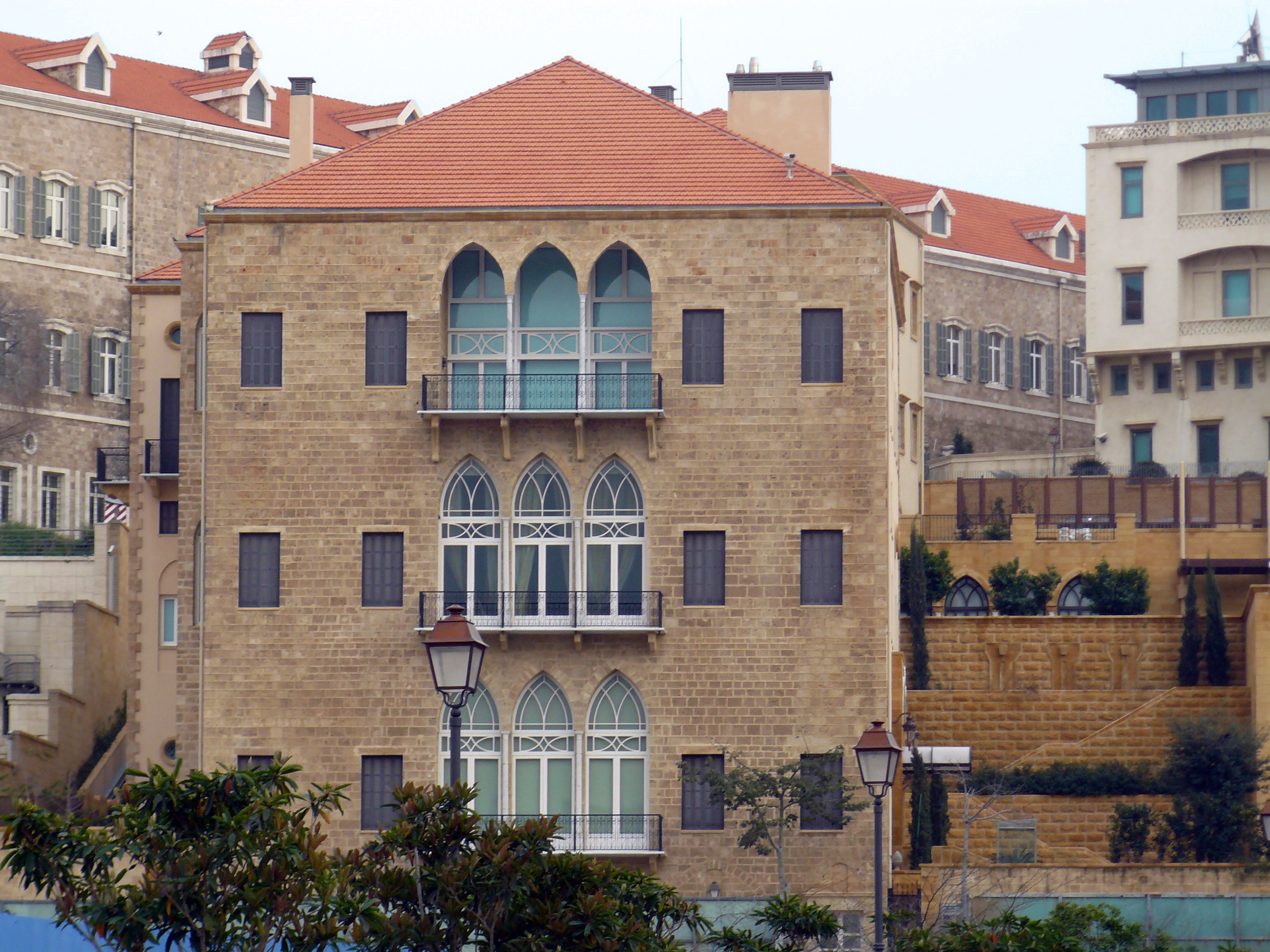
Typical Lebanese houses in the Wadi Abu Jamil neighborhood

Wadi Abu Jamil (Arabic: وادي أبو جميل, French: Wadi Abou Jamil) is the former Jewish quarter in Beirut, Lebanon, located in the city's central district.

== History ==
Formerly known as Wadi al-Yahoud (meaning "Valley of the Jews"), the quarter was the center of the Lebanese Jewish community, with Beirut's largest and most important synagogue, the Maghen Abraham Synagogue, located there. Most of neighborhood’s Jews were Syrian from Aleppo and Damascus, with smaller numbers from Iraq, Greece, Turkey, and Iran.

Emigration from the community began in earnest after the 1967 Arab-Israeli war. During the 1982 Lebanon War, Yasir Arafat's PLO forces took over much of the neighborhood, which was located along the dividing line between the two sides of the Lebanese Civil War. During the war, Israeli bombardment damaged the Maghen Abraham Synagogue.

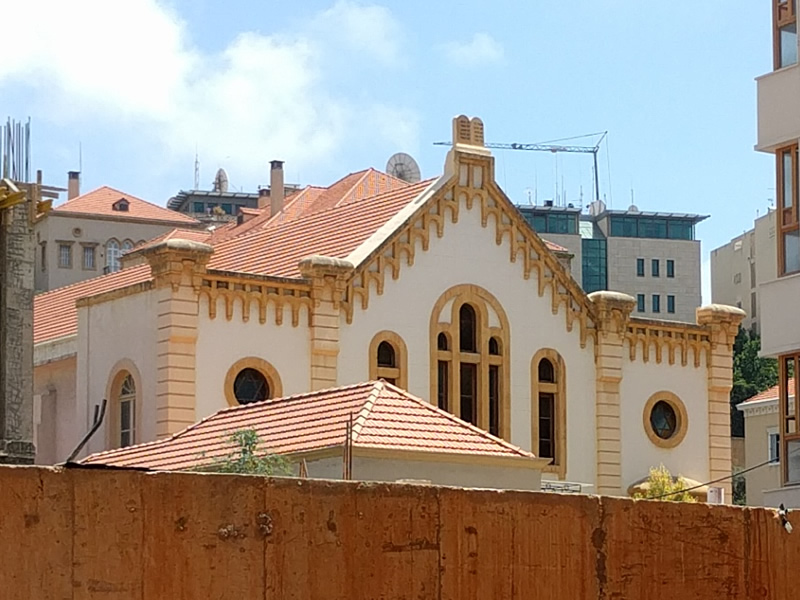
Magen Abraham Synagogue

The area today is home to around 29 Lebanese Jews, mostly elderly.

== Synagogue renovation ==
Renovation of the Maghen Abraham Synagogue began in the summer of 2009. Funding for the renovation includes donations from the Lebanese Jewish Community Council and Jewish Lebanese living overseas. Isaac Arazi, the leader of the Jewish community in Lebanon has managed to raise $40,000 from private donors. Renovation is estimated to cost between $1 million and $1.5 million. Solidere, the Lebanese joint-stock company responsible for much of Central Beirut’s reconstruction, has donated $150,000 toward the renovation effort. Lebanese architect Nabil Gholam has played an important role in the redevelopment planning process.

== See also ==
- Beirut Central District
- History of the Jews in Lebanon
