= Congregation Maghen Abraham (Montreal) =

Sephardi Jewish Lebanese in Canada

- French: La Synagogue Maghen Abraham de Montreal, lit. 'Shield of Abraham'
- Location in Montreal

Religion
- Affiliation: Judaism
- Sect: Jewish Lebanese
- Province: Quebec
- Region: Hampstead
- Rite: Sephardi
- Ecclesiastical or organisational status: Synagogue
- Leadership: Rabbi David Azerad, Rav Raphael Benisty
- Status: Active

Location
- Location: 223 Harrow Crescent, Hampstead Montreal, Quebec
- Municipality: Hampstead
- Country: Canada
- Coordinates: 45°29′24″N 73°37′54″W

Architecture
- Type: Synagogue

Website
- www.maghenabraham.com

Congregation Maghen Abraham in Montreal (French: La Synagogue Maghen Abraham de Montreal, lit. 'Shield of Abraham') is a Sephardi Jewish Lebanese community located in the district of Hampstead in Montreal, Quebec, Canada.

It is named in honor of the Maghen Abraham Synagogue in Beirut, Lebanon. The congregation was founded to meet the needs of Jewish Lebanese families moving to Montreal.

In the sanctuary, Torah is read to the congregation from the bimah and the Torah scrolls are stored in the aron kodesh on the east wall. The congregation faces towards the east, and Jerusalem, in praying. The ornamentation features symbols such as Stars of David, signs of the zodiac and natural forms.
