= Bhamdoun =

Bhamdoun بحمدون
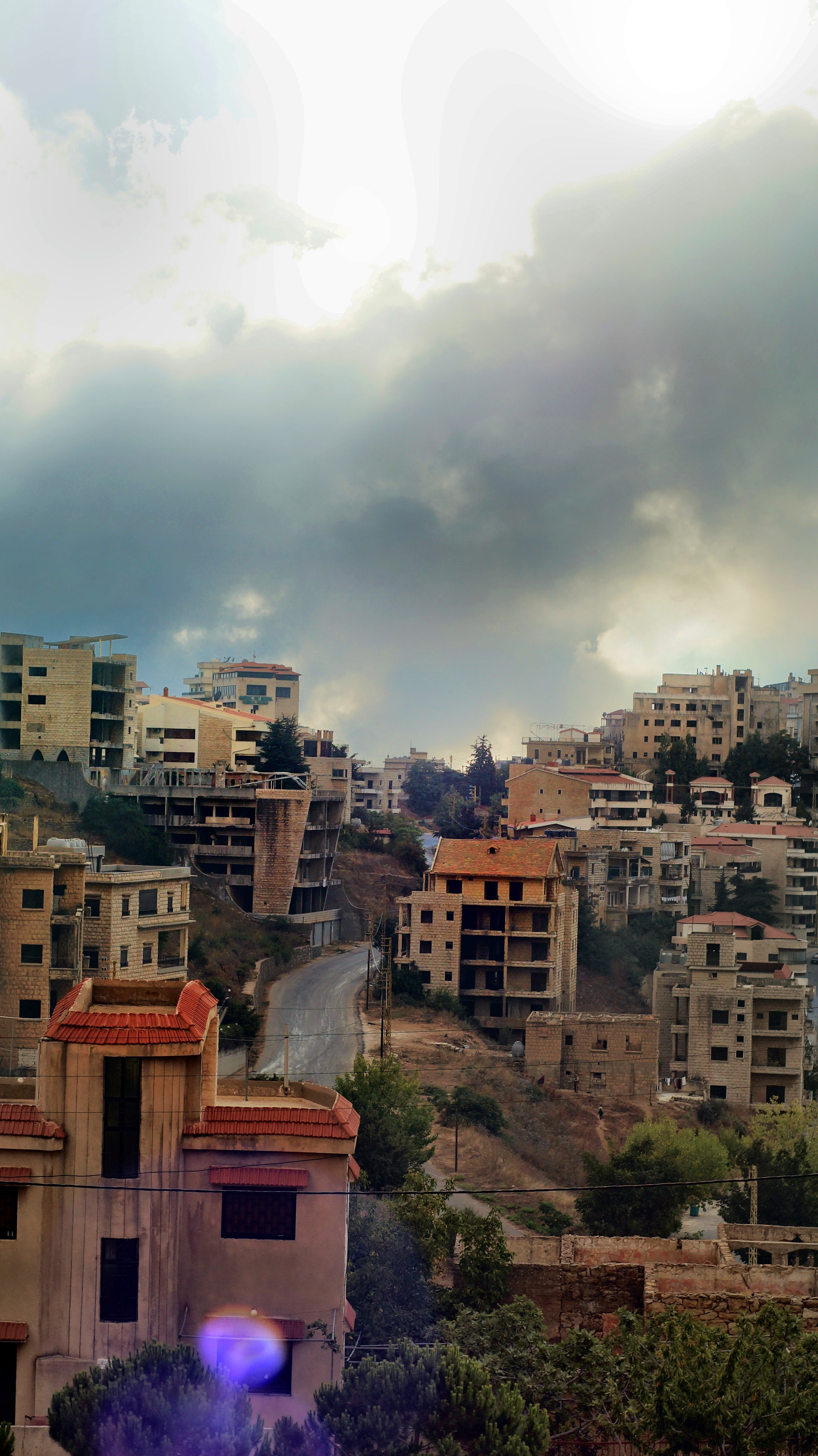
- Bhamdoun

- Location in Lebanon
- Coordinates: 33°48′35″N 35°39′19″E
- Country: Lebanon
- Governorate: Mount Lebanon Governorate
- District: Aley District
- Time zone: UTC+2 (EET)
  - Summer (DST): +3

Bhamdoun (Arabic: بحمدون, romanized: Bḥamdūn), is a town in Lebanon 23 km (14 mi) from Beirut on the main road that leads to Damascus (Beirut - Damascus road) and in the suburbs of the main tourist city of Aley, lying at an altitude of 1,150 m (3,770 ft) above the Lamartine valley.

== Geography ==
Two separate villages compose the town, Bhamdoun-al-mahatta (literally meaning "Bhamdoun the station") and Bhamdoun-el-day'aa ("Bhamdoun the village").

A railroad used to link Bhamdoun to Beirut with the train station being a prominent feature of the town for many years. The station and railroad were eventually abandoned after the Lebanese civil war when cars became more popular.

== History ==
During the 1860 civil conflict in Mount Lebanon, the Druze spared the village of Bhamdoun from attack, due to appeals of the resident American missionary to prevent violence.

== Tourism ==
Before the Lebanese civil war, Bhamdoun was one of Lebanon's most renowned and favorite summer resorts. Today, the town has regained some of its past tourism industry as most of its hotels, restaurants and entertainment centers have been renovated or rebuilt (Such as the "Hotel la Roche" That worked on renovations after the conflict). Tourists, especially from Kuwait and the Persian Gulf region spend their summer vacation in Bhamdoun. Kuwaiti citizens claim ownership of more than 30% of the properties in Bhamdoun-al-mahatta since the 1950s. A branch of Kuwait Airways and the National bank of kuwait reopened in 2001.

The town also contains the Safir Hotel, a Four Star Hotel by Sheraton, Carlton Hotel, Al sheikh Hotel, that worked on renovations in 2025 and many others.

== Religion ==
Bhamdoun has seven churches, two mosques built by Kuwaitis, and the Bhamdoun synagogue, abandoned in the civil war. There are four Greek Orthodox churches, two Maronite churches, one Protestant church but was not reconstructed after the war. Most of the population is Orthodox Christian with a minority Maronite presence.

The Shia Muslim minority slightly increased in Bhamdoun during the 2023-2024 Hezbollah-Israel conflict; the minority increased as said Muslims that were living in targeted areas such as Southern Lebanon and the Dahieh suburbs of Beirut immigrated to remote villages all over central Lebanon, including Bhamdoun.

The Bhamdoun synagogue, built in 1910, was one of three grand synagogues in Lebanon. It was abandoned shortly before the civil war which started in 1975, but the shell of the structure still stands.

== Wine ==
In 2000, a winery called Chateau Belle-Vue began planting vines, creating few jobs in the village. It began producing wine in 2003. The "Renaissance 2003" blend that it produced won the International Spirits and Wine Competition's Gold Medal Best in Class award in 2005.

== Climate ==
Climate data for Bhamdoun, elevation 1,130 m (3,710 ft)
Month	Jan	Feb	Mar	Apr	May	Jun	Jul	Aug	Sep	Oct	Nov	Dec	Year
Mean daily maximum °C (°F)	10.1 (50.2)	10.3 (50.5)	12.6 (54.7)	16.7 (62.1)	20.7 (69.3)	24.1 (75.4)	25.7 (78.3)	26.3 (79.3)	23.7 (74.7)	21.2 (70.2)	17.0 (62.6)	12.3 (54.1)	18.4 (65.1)
Daily mean °C (°F)	6.9 (44.4)	7.0 (44.6)	9.1 (48.4)	12.8 (55.0)	16.7 (62.1)	20.1 (68.2)	21.7 (71.1)	22.2 (72.0)	19.3 (66.7)	17.1 (62.8)	12.6 (54.7)	9.1 (48.4)	14.6 (58.2)
Mean daily minimum °C (°F)	4.5 (40.1)	4.5 (40.1)	6.0 (42.8)	9.3 (48.7)	12.8 (55.0)	15.8 (60.4)	17.6 (63.7)	18.1 (64.6)	15.6 (60.1)	13.6 (56.5)	10.6 (51.1)	6.8 (44.2)	11.3 (52.3)
Average precipitation mm (inches)	302 (11.9)	262 (10.3)	194 (7.6)	95 (3.7)	40 (1.6)	1 (0.0)	0 (0)	0 (0)	3 (0.1)	54 (2.1)	132 (5.2)	239 (9.4)	1,322 (51.9)
Source: FAO

== Notable people ==
- Mary Lathrop Benton (1864–1955), educator
