= Maghen Abraham Synagogue =

Synagogue in Beirut, Lebanon

- Arabic: كنيس ماغين أبراهام; Hebrew: בית הכנסת מגן אברהם
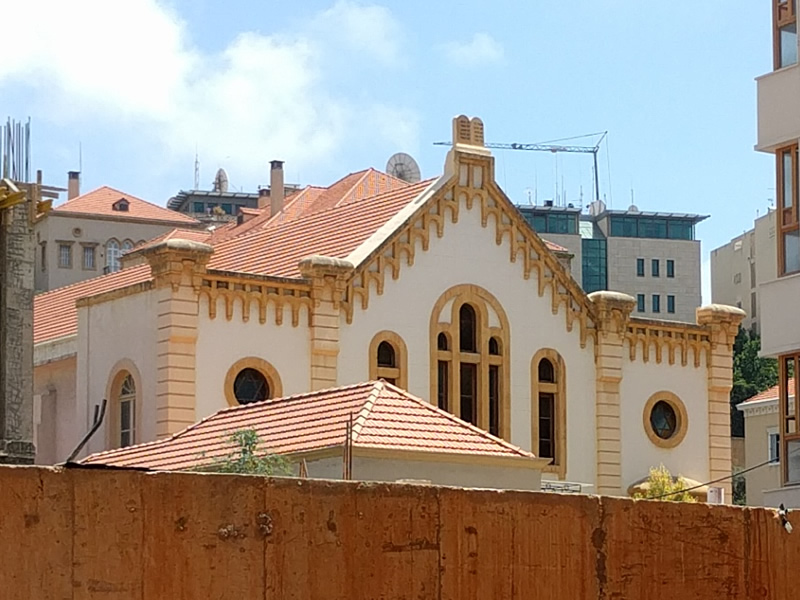
- The synagogue in 2016

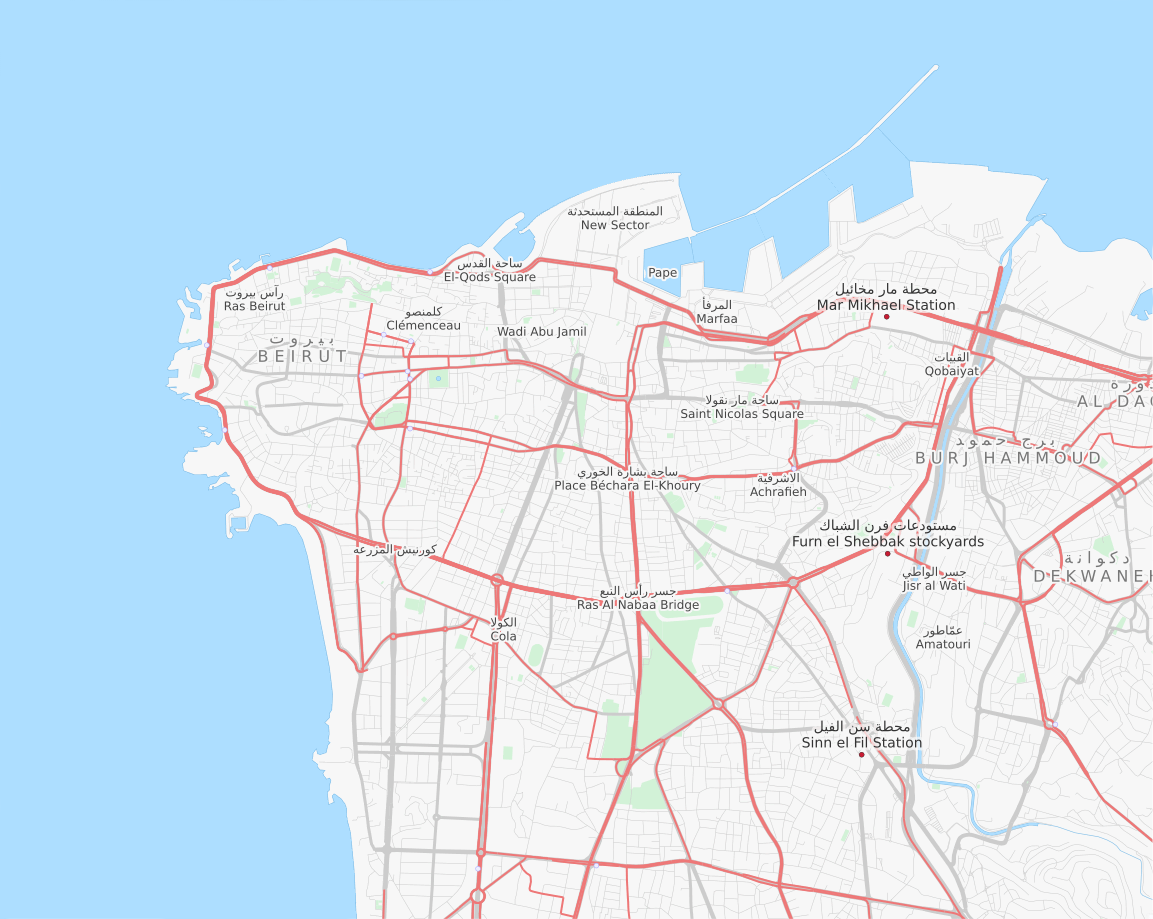
- Location of the synagogue in Beirut

Religion
- Affiliation: Judaism
- Rite: Nusach Sefard
- Ecclesiastical or organizational status: Synagogue (1925–1982); Ruins (1982–2009); Synagogue (since 2014)
- Governing body: Lebanese Jewish Community Council
- Leadership: Isaac Arazi
- Status: Active

Location
- Location: Wadi Abu Jamil, Beirut
- Country: Lebanon
- Interactive map of Maghen Abraham Synagogue
- Coordinates: 33°53′50.81″N 35°30′0.36″E

Architecture
- Architect: Bindo Manham
- Type: Synagogue architecture
- Style: Rundbogenstil
- Founder: Moise Abraham Sassoon
- Completed: 1925

The Maghen Abraham Synagogue (Arabic: كنيس ماغين أبراهام, romanized: Kanīs Mā'ghīn Abrā'hām; Hebrew: בית הכנסת מגן אברהם, romanized: Beth HaKenesset Magen Avraham) is a synagogue, located in the Jewish district of Wadi Abu Jamil in downtown Beirut, Lebanon.

Established in 1925, the synagogue was damaged by Israeli bombardment during the Lebanese Civil War. Restoration of the synagogue began in May 2009. In August 2010, renovations neared completion, with finishing touches made to the interior of the building. Haaretz reported that "synagogue restored to glory" and "has been renovated beautifully". The synagogue reopened in c. 2014, and was slightly damaged in the 2020 Beirut explosions.

Maghen Abraham has a daughter synagogue in Canada, Congregation Maghen Abraham.

== History ==
An older synagogue in Beirut was demolished in 502 CE by a great earthquake which destroyed several cities in Lebanon. Maghen Abraham was constructed in 1925 and named after by its funder and benefactor, the son of Abraham Sassoon, Moise Abraham Sassoon of Calcutta, on land donated by Isaac Mann. It was designed by the architect Bindo Manham and construction was overseen by Ezra Benjamin and Joseph Balayla." The head of the Jewish community, Josef Farhi, helped in raising additional funds to complete the interior. The synagogue was also used for Torah and scientific lectures, weddings and other festive events.

In the 1950s and 1960s there were sixteen synagogues in Beirut and they were all full, according to a Lebanese expatriate who moved from Beirut to Paris in 2003. Jews were entitled to the same rights as other minorities and the number of Jews was increasing even after the 1948 Arab-Israeli war, by which time there were about 14,000 Jews in Lebanon. In 1976, a year after the civil war began, Joseph Farhi transferred the Torah scrolls from the synagogue to Geneva and entrusted to renowned Jewish-Lebanese banker Edmond Safra, who preserved them in his bank's coffers. Most of them have since been relocated to Sephardic synagogues in Israel.

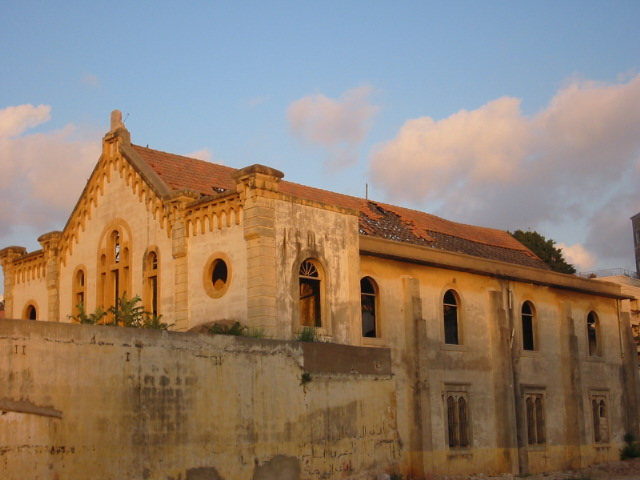
Maghen Abraham Synagogue, prior to restoration.

Although the greater part of the community had already emigrated after the 1958 Crisis and the Lebanese Civil War, there were approximately 100 Jewish families still living in the quarters of the synagogue prior to the Israeli invasion of Lebanon. During the 1982 Lebanon war, Yasir Arafat's PLO forces and the Christian Phalangists were situated in Wadi Abu Jamil, leading to Israeli suspicion of there being Palestinian weapons in the quarter. On 12 August 1982, an Israeli bombardment damaged the synagogue. The synagogue was abandoned after Israeli shells hit the building, leaving rubble and debris strewn across the floor. Two marble tablets representing the Ten Commandments and a marble Star of David were also shattered. Dozens of Jewish families were among those displaced by shelling of the area.

== Renovation ==
Renovations of the ruined synagogue began in 2009. The project's authorization were agreed by the Lebanese government, Hezbollah, and other community leaders. The renovation, funded by $200,000 worth of private donations, also received a $150,000 grant from Solidere, a Lebanese construction firm privately owned by the family of Rafik Hariri.

Long ago, there was a decision by the late former Prime Minister, Rafik Hariri, to restore the synagogue and surround it with a garden.

By the spring of 2008, the Jewish expatriates expressed their desire to renovate the synagogue. They wished to proceed once stability within Lebanon improved. Long afterwards, the expatriates stated that the synagogue, along with the Jewish cemetery in Sodeco, would be renovated from October 2008. According to Bloomberg, Prime Minister Fouad Siniora was quoted as saying:

We respect Judaism, just as we respect Christianity. Our only problem is with Israel.

Hezbollah leader, Hassan Nasrallah, welcomed the renovation, saying "This is a religious place of worship and its restoration is welcome." Also, Hussain Rahal, a spokesman for Hezbollah, said his group also supported the restoration of the synagogue: "We respect the Jewish religion just like we do Christianity. The Jews have always lived among us. We have an issue with Israel's occupation of land."

Fundings had already been received by the 65-year-old leader of the minute Jewish community, Isaac Arazi. Arazi estimated that the synagogue would require up to $1 million for renovation. He managed to raise up to $40,000 for the project, promising more to come. Solidere SAL, civil-engineering company owned by the Hariri family, had also given $150,000 to each of 14 religious organizations that are restoring places of worship in Lebanon, about $2.1 million in all. "We help all the communities," said Solidere chairman Nasser Chammaa. Also, in Switzerland, a couple of banks, whose owners were of Lebanese-Jewish roots, had agreed to provide financing. One offered a sum of $100,000, but Arazi declined to mention its name.

The restoration was due to have started in November 2008, but the 2008 financial crisis delayed those plans. However, renovation has started, as other construction projects around the area are being executed. As of October 2010, the renovations neared completion. Haaretz reported that "synagogue restored to glory" and "has been renovated beautifully". The synagogue reopened in c. 2014, and was slightly damaged in the 2020 Beirut explosions.

== See also ==
- Zaki Cohen, Beirut Chief Rabbi
- Jewish Cemetery (Beirut)
- History of the Jews in Lebanon
- List of synagogues in Lebanon
