= Al Bustan Festival =

Annual music and performing arts festival in Lebanon

- Genre: music, drama, dance
- Venue: Al Bustan Hotel
- Locations: Beit Mery, Lebanon
- Years active: 1994; 32 years ago
- Founders: Myrna Bustani
- Website: albustanfestival.com

The Al Bustan Festival of Music and the Performing Arts is an annual music and performing arts festival based in Beit Mery, Lebanon. The festival occurs every year over five weeks during February and March. It is a non-profit and the first major festival in Lebanon dedicated to classical music.

== Background ==
The Al Bustan Festival of Music and the Performing Arts was founded in 1994 by Myrna Bustani to revive the country's cultural scene after seventeen years of civil war. Every year the festival organizes a program exploring a particular theme. In 2016 Music & Shakespeare was selected as the theme to mark 400 years since the death of William Shakespeare, the English playwright.

Most performances are held at the Emile Bustani Auditorium of the Al Bustan Hotel in Beit Mery, with the rest occurring in churches and cultural venues across Lebanon, such as the Sursock Palace and the Jeita Grotto.

The festival performances include opera, dance, and orchestral concerts, performed by a mix of international artists and local ensembles. Public master classes and workshops are organized with visiting artists to keep up with the festival's cultural vocation. Most of the festival budget is covered by donations from private sponsors and foundations. The festival is also known for spotting rising stars and showcasing them early in their careers.

== Selection of past performers ==
Pianists: Abdel Rahman El Bacha; Khatia Buniatishvili; Boris Berezovsky; Katia & Marielle Labèque; Fazil Say; Gloria Campaner; Khaled Mouzanar; Violinists: Salvatore Accardo; Renaud Capuçon; Patricia Kopatchinskaya; Gidon Kremer; Sergei Krylov; Charlie Siem; Vadim Repin; Yury Revich; Singers: June Anderson; Joseph Calleja; Javier Camarena; Joyce El Khoury; Ermonela Jaho; Inva Mulla; Anita Rachvelishvili; Andreas Scholl; Oumeima El Khalil; Cellists: Gautier Capucon; Steven Isserlis; Victor Julien-Laferrière; Antonio Meneses; Edgar Moreau; Julian Lloyd Weber; Flutists: Emmanuel Pahud	Orchestras: Lebanese Philharmonic Orchestra; Lucerne Symphony Orchestra; Quartet, Chamber Ensemble: Camerata Salzburg; Leipzig String Quartet; Mozarteum Quartet; Sinfonia Varsovia; Wiener Kammerensemble; Opera Companies: The Helikon Opera of Moscow; Teatro dell'Opera di Roma; Baroque Orchestra: Accademia Bizantina; Conductors: Gerd Albrecht; Vladimir Ponkin; Jérémie Rohrer; Sergey Smbatyan; Glass Marcano; André Hajj; World Music: Mario Frangoulis; Katia Guerreiro; Soweto Gospel Choir; Theatre Companies: Shakespeare's Globe Theatre; Dance: Paco Pena Flamenco Dance Company; Irek Mukhamedov & Company; Puppet Companies: Salzburg Marionettes
