= Cristiano Leone =

Italian philologist

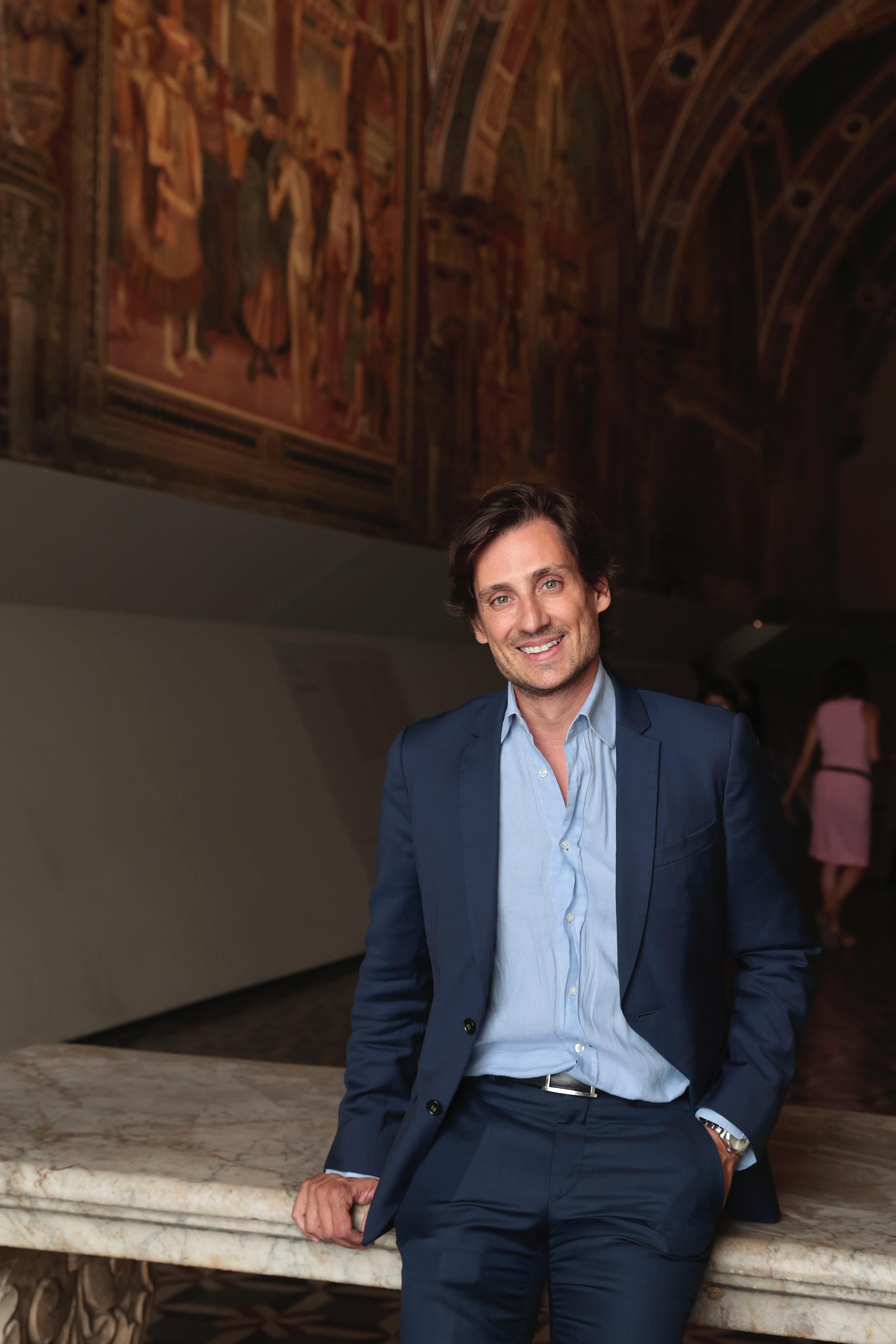
- Occupations: Curator, artistic director, playwright
- Employer(s): Villa Medici, National Roman Museum, Sciences Po, Bocconi University, Santa Maria della Scala

Cristiano Leone is an Italian philologist, known for his roles as curator, artistic director and playwright.

He has worked both in the public and private sectors and has collaborated with Paris-Sorbonne University, French Academy in Rome, Electa, the National Roman Museum, the Spanish Embassy in Italy, the Bath of Caracalla, and the Centre des Monuments Nationaux - Cité internationale de la langue française. He has taught at University of Namur, Sciences Po Paris, Bocconi University in Milan and LUISS Guido Carli Business School in Rome.

He has published landmark medievalist works on the fables of Petrus Alphonsi, providing an original genealogy and historical context of these texts. His new translation and informative introduction on Petrus Alphonsi's Disciplina clericalis substantially contributed to understanding Exempla literature in Latin and vernacular.

He was responsible for the cultural programming and for communication at the French Academy in Rome from 2016 to 2019. For this institution, he organised numerous public meetings, curated and coordinated exhibitions with French, Italian and international leading artists.

Since 2019 he runs his own production company, Cristiano Leone Productions. His curatorial approach seeks to connect and encourage the dialogue between contemporary creation, and historical and artistic heritage.

As artistic and linguistic director, he was instrumental in developing ideas for transforming the Château de Villers-Cotterêts into the future Cité internationale de la langue française.

In November 2023 Cristiano Leone launched at MAXXI Museum in Rome his latest work: Atlas of Performing Culture, the first volume published by Rizzoli New York with the ambition to place the phenomenon of performance through a broad cultural lens.

Since January 2024 he is the President of the Santa Maria della Scala Foundation, the largest museum complex in Siena.

== Research and Teaching ==
Cristiano Leone holds a European PhD in Romance Philology (University of Siena), and an Executive Master of Management (Solvay Brussels School of Economics and Management).

He published in 2010 the first commented edition in Italian of the Disciplina clericalis by Petrus Alphonsi. For the Accademia Nazionale dei Lincei, he edited and published for the first time the Alphunsus de Arabicis eventibus.

He has taught courses in Linguistics and Philology at the University of Namur, in Humanities and History at Sciences Po in Paris, and in Cultural Programming at the LUISS Guido Carli Business School in Rome. Currently, he is in charge of seminars on Artistic Direction and Performance Art at Sciences Po Paris and lectures on Performing Arts Management at the Bocconi University, as part of the Master in Art Management and Administration.

He was in charge of 'Training and Education' at Paris-Sorbonne University from 2014 to 2016, where he coordinated the innovation projects anticipating the unification of the Parisian universities.

== Artistic direction ==
From 2016 to 2019, Cristiano Leone was in charge of the cultural programming and communication at the French Academy in Rome, under Muriel Mayette-Holtz's direction. For this institution, he curated six seasons of the Thursday at the Villa, weekly appointments with masters of contemporary creation. International personalities were invited to interact with the Romans, which contributed to opening the institution to the public. He also coordinated several exhibitions and curated "Ileana Florescu – Les Chambres du Jardin". In 2016 he took over the artistic direction of the contemporary music festival Villa Aperta. On this occasion, he promoted collaborations between visual artists and musicians, notably inviting the Nobel Prize for Literature Gao Xingjian.

For the National Roman Museum and its concession holder Electa, he conceived in 2018 the festival Ō Music, Dance and Art at the Baths of Diocletian. The first edition brought together more than 40 international artists, including Anna Calvi, Seth Troxler, Francesco Tristano, Francis Kurkdjian, and Omar Souleyman.

The festival's second edition in 2019 was re-baptised Ō Tempo di, design, dance, music, theater, cinema and photography at the National Roman Museum. This edition, more extensive, also occupied the Palazzo Altemps and staged among other things a tribute to Fellini by violinist Yury Revich, Pierre Yovanovitch, and the danseur étoile Benjamin Pech.

Since 2019, he runs his own production company: Cristiano Leone Productions. In 2020 he produced and directed the first chapter of a series called RADIX, a short film promoted by the Cultural Office of the Spanish Embassy in Rome, with the collaboration of the Cervantes Institute in Rome and the Spanish Academy. RADIX invited the Spanish choreographer Iván Pérez, director of the Dance Theatre Heidelberg DTH since 2018, to interact through the medium of dance with the words of the philosopher Seneca in the setting of the Tempietto del Bramante, reviving the shared cultural roots of Italy and Spain.

RADIX II premiered in September 2021 on Rai Cultura. It pays homage to two anti-fascists intellectuals: Rafael Alberti and his wife Maria Teresa León. They opposed the Francoist regime and embarked on a 37-year exile. From 1963 Rome became their new homeland for over a decade. The protagonists of RADIX II, the Basque choreographer and dancer Iratxe Ansa and the Italian dancer Igor Bacovich, read some excerpts from the two writers and dance throughout the external spaces of the Baths of Caracalla. They also evoke the edict by which the Roman emperor granted universal citizenship to all inhabitants of the empire. RADIX II is dedicated to all who live a form of exile for having chosen to defend their ideals.

RADIX III concludes the triptych. Shot in the Borghese Gallery, it again features choreographer-dancers Iratxe Ansa and Igor Bacovich. In this film, they confront two masterpieces of the Italian Baroque: the sculptures Apollo and Daphne and The Rape of Proserpina by Gian Lorenzo Bernini, inspired by Ovid's Metamorphoses.

RADIX III deals with highly topical issues, such as the abuse of power, the boundary between consent and refusal, the entanglement of desire, domestic violence, rape, and kidnapping, as well as artistic representations of those themes throughout the centuries.

RADIX III was presented at the Auditorium Parco della Musica Ennio Morricone as part of the dance festival Equilibrio.

In July 2022, Cristiano Leone acted as playwright and curator of the experimental exhibition Animal Lexicon by the multimedia artist Yuval Avital. This exhibition, created as part of the 2022 Bestiary of the Earth project for the Reggio Parma Festival, in collaboration with Parma’s Teatro Due, blends visual and performance art with theater.

In February 2023, Animal Lexicon appeared in a new and surprising form, comprising installations and performance at the Baths of Caracalla. As the second chapter of this artistic project, entitled Mysterion, it was conceived as a celebration of the underground areas of that vast monumental complex and its ancient Mithraeum, which, after many centuries, again welcomed the ritualism of the cult of Mithras, though in a contemporary mode.

Defined as “a journey into the abyss of the most emotional, instinctive and animalistic sphere of the human being”, the project proved a success with both the public and critics.

In October 2025, he was honoured with the title of Cultural Leader at the 4th edition of Italian Design Week in Washington, D.C.

== European engagement ==
He co-authored an open letter to Angela Merkel, François Hollande and Matteo Renzi on the importance of cultural and youth policies to rebuild a European identity, alongside Wim Wenders, Felipe González, and other intellectuals. The tribune was published in Libération, Die Welt and La Repubblica.

During the debate on the topic "Europe, Security and Reforms", he spoke at the Italian Chamber of Deputies on 27 September 2017.

For the Institute for International Political Studies (ISPI) he wrote an open call to create a large-scale Italian festival aimed to promote the dialogue between contemporary creation and historical heritage.

== Theatre and television ==
Cristiano Leone is the author of the program "Il giorno della Libertà" for the Italian national channel Rai 3, broadcast on the occasion of the 30th anniversary of the Fall of the Berlin Wall.

He made his debut as a playwright in 2019, during the 55th season of the National Institute of Ancient Drama (INDA) at the Greek Theatre of Syracuse. He presented an adapted version of the classical Greek tragedy The Trojan Women by Euripides, in the acclaimed production directed by Muriel Mayette-Holtz and a set designed by Stefano Boeri.

In 2020, he was the dramaturge and director for the "Processo a Maria-Antonietta" in the Ō Tempo di festival.

== Publications ==
Art Catalogs

– Curatorship

- L’Académie de France à Rome – Villa Médicis. Roma: Electa. 2018. 132 p. ISBN 9788891817679
- Ileana Florescu Le stanze del giardino / Les chambres du jardin. Roma: Electa. 2018. 48 p. ISBN 9788891819635
- Villa Médicis L'Académie de France à Rome raccontée aux plus jeunes / raccontata ai più giovani, Giulia D’Anna Lupo, Chiara Mezzalama, édité par Cristiano Leone. Roma: Electa. 2018. 80 p. ISBN 9788891821461

– Editorial direction

- Romamor, Anne & Patrick Poirier. Verona: Mondadori Electa. 2019. 93 p.
- Le violon d’Ingres, Verona: Mondadori Electa. 2018. 182 p. ISBN 978-88-918-2205-5
- Take me (I’m yours). Rome: Accademia di Francia a Roma-Villa Medici. 2018
- Katarina Grosse & Tatiana Trouvé, Le numerose irregolarità. Rome: Electa, 2018 ISBN 978-88-918-1880-5
- Elizabeth Peyton & Camille Claudel, Eternelle idole. Rome: Electa. 2017. 96 p. ISBN 978-88-918-1712-9
- Swimming is saving . Rome: Electa. 2017 ISBN 978-88-918-1631-3
- Yoko Ono & Claire Tabouret, One day I broke a mirror. Rome: Electa. 2017 ISBN 978-88-9181337-4
- Messaggera, Annette Messager. Rome: Electa. 2017 ISBN 978-88-9181337-4

Books

- Disciplina clericalis. Roma: Salerno Editrice, collection "Testi e documenti di letteratura e di lingua n˚ 31". 2010. 187 p. ISBN 978-88-8402-689-7
- Alphunsus de Arabicis eventibus. Studio ed edizione critica, Roma: Accademia Nazionale de Lincei, collection "Classe di Scienze Morali, Storiche e Filologiche – Memorie serie IX – vol. XXVIII – fasc. 2". 2012 ISBN 978-8-82181-039-8

Articles (selection)

- "Gli epitaffi della ‘Disciplina clericalis’ e della tomba di Giratto: iscrizioni funerarie tra Oriente e Occidente", in Studi mediolatini e volgari, LV. 2009. pp. 97–107.
- "La réception occidentale du Mukhtar al-hikam à travers ses traductions", in Corpus, Genres, Théories et Méthodes: construction d’une base de données, edited by M.-C. Bornes-Varol and M.- S. Ortola. Nancy: Presses Universitaires. 2010. pp. 81–100. ISBN 2814300172
- "Une relecture occidentale de la didactique orientale: de la ‘Disciplina clericalis’ et ses traductions-réécritures", in Didaktisches Erzählen. Formen literarischer Belehrung in Orient und Okzident, edited by R. Günthart e R. Forster. Frankfurt a. M.: Lang. 2010. pp. 227–41. ISBN 3631599994
- "De la Disciplina clericalis à l’Alphunsus de Arabicis eventibus: vers une redéfinition des protagonistes", in Formes dialoguées dans la littérature exemplaire du Moyen Âge, directed by M.-A. Polo de Beaulieu, J. Berlioz, P. Collomb. Paris: Champion. 2012. pp. 359–75. ISBN 9782745323354
- "La performance è solo live? Qualche considerazione inattuale sul rapporto tra arti performative e strumenti audiovisivi", in Riaprire il sipario, ed. Antonio Capitano. Roma: Albeggi Edizioni. 2021. pp. 141–150. ISBN 978-88-98795-63-5
