= Al Bustan Hotel =

Hotel in Beirut, Lebanon

Coordinates: 33.8609°N 35.6023°E

- فندق البستان
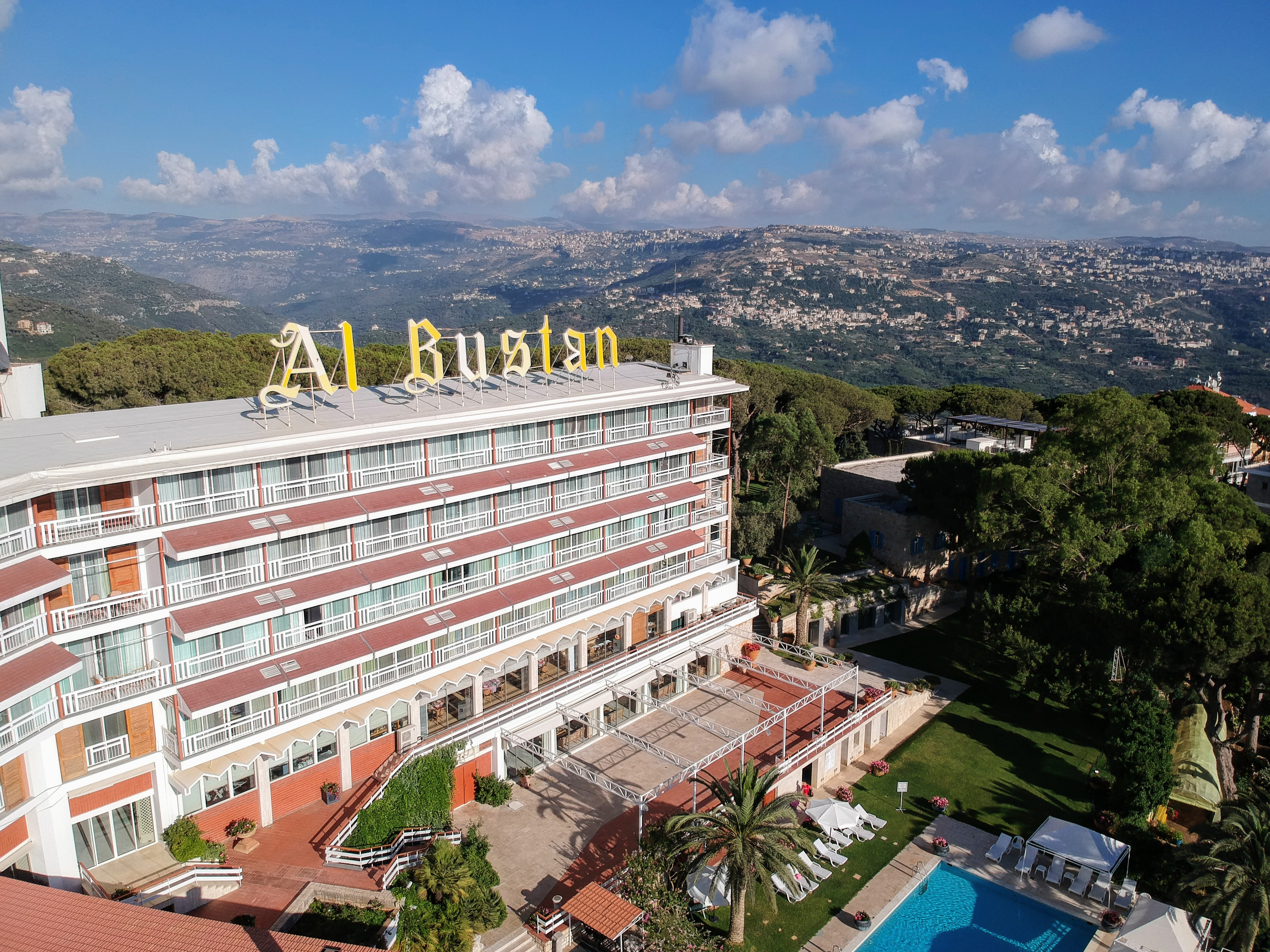
- Interactive map of the Al Bustan Hotel area

General information
- Location: VJ62+9X4, Beit Mery, Ain Saadeh, Lebanon, Lebanon
- Year built: 1930-1967
- Opened: 1967; 59 years ago

Technical details
- Floor count: 6-7

Other information
- Number of rooms: 117 (21 suites)

Website
- hotelalbustan.com

Al Bustan Hotel is a hotel located in Beit Mery, Lebanon which opened in 1967.

== History ==
In 1962, Lebanese entrepreneur Emile Bustani purchased the 1930 hotel called the Grand Hotel, where he and his wife used to go dancing before they married in the 1930s. He had bought the building with the intention of developing it. In order for redevelopment to happen, they needed to demolish the old hotel. Construction for the new hotel started in 1962. Emile died before its completion. However, his wife and daughter Myrna Bustani continued the development of the project.

By 1967, the hotel was officially completed and ready for its grand opening. Bustani's wife chose the name "Al Bustan" (The Garden) – it was the first hotel of the time to take an Arabic name, when Beirut's hotels all took European names. The Al Bustan would become an important Lebanese landmark.

== Amenities ==
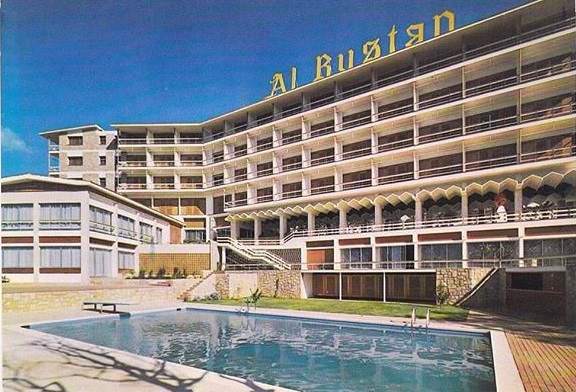
Al Bustan hotel, 1970

The hotel is located on the top of Beit Mery hill, overlooking Beirut and the Mediterranean Sea. It features an art collection of antiquities, sculpture, paintings, watercolors and prints, in the lounges and bedrooms. It has 117 rooms, 21 suites, an outdoor pool, a gym, a restaurant and an auditorium.

== The International Al Bustan Festival of Music and the Arts ==
The International Al Bustan Festival of Music and the Arts takes place at the hotel annually, since 1994. Myrna Bustani is the founder of the festival.
