= Emile Bustani =

Lebanese entrepreneur and politician (1907–1963)

Emile Morched Bustani
- إميل مرشد البستاني
- In office 1951 – March 15, 1963

Personal details
- Born: 1907 Dibbiyeh-Chouf, Lebanon
- Died: March 15, 1963 (age 56)
- Citizenship: Lebanese
- Education: American University of Beirut, Massachusetts Institute of Technology
- Occupation: entrepreneur, philanthropist, politician

Emile Morched Bustani (Arabic: إميل مرشد البستاني; 1907- March 15, 1963) was a Lebanese entrepreneur, philanthropist and politician.

== Early life and education ==
Bustani was born in 1907 in Dibbiyeh – Chouf. After he lost his father at age of six, Bustani was raised by American missionaries at the Gerard Institute in Sidon – South Lebanon. Later, Bustani received help from a wealthy Lebanese businessman to study engineering at the American University of Beirut, from where he received a BS in that field by 1929.

In 1930, he rejoined AUB as an instructor in Physics and as a Graduate student he received his MA in Astro-Physics by 1932. A year later in 1933, he obtained a BS in civil engineering from Massachusetts Institute of Technology, USA.

== Career ==
Back in Beirut after MIT, Bustani worked for a time with the Iraq Petroleum Company, but soon founded his own Contracting and Trading Company, CAT – a company involved in laying and constructing oil pipelines, building roads and constructing cities throughout the Middle East.

Bustani was elected a Member of Parliament in Lebanon in 1951, an office he held until his death in 1963.

In 1962, he purchased the 1930 hotel called the Grand Hotel, where he and his wife used to go dancing before they married in the 1930s. He had bought the building with the intention of developing it. In order for redevelopment to happen, they needed to demolish the old hotel. Construction for the new hotel started in 1962. Bustani died before its completion. However, his wife and daughter Myrna Bustani continued the development of the project, which was finished in 1967 and named Al Bustan Hotel.

== Death and legacy ==
Bustani died on March 15, 1963 (age 56) when his airplane crashed off the coast of Beirut in a heavy storm.

He is the father of Mirna Bustani, first woman to be elected in the Lebanese Parliament.
