= Yuval Avital =

Israeli artist and musician (born 1977)

Yuval Avital יובל אביטל
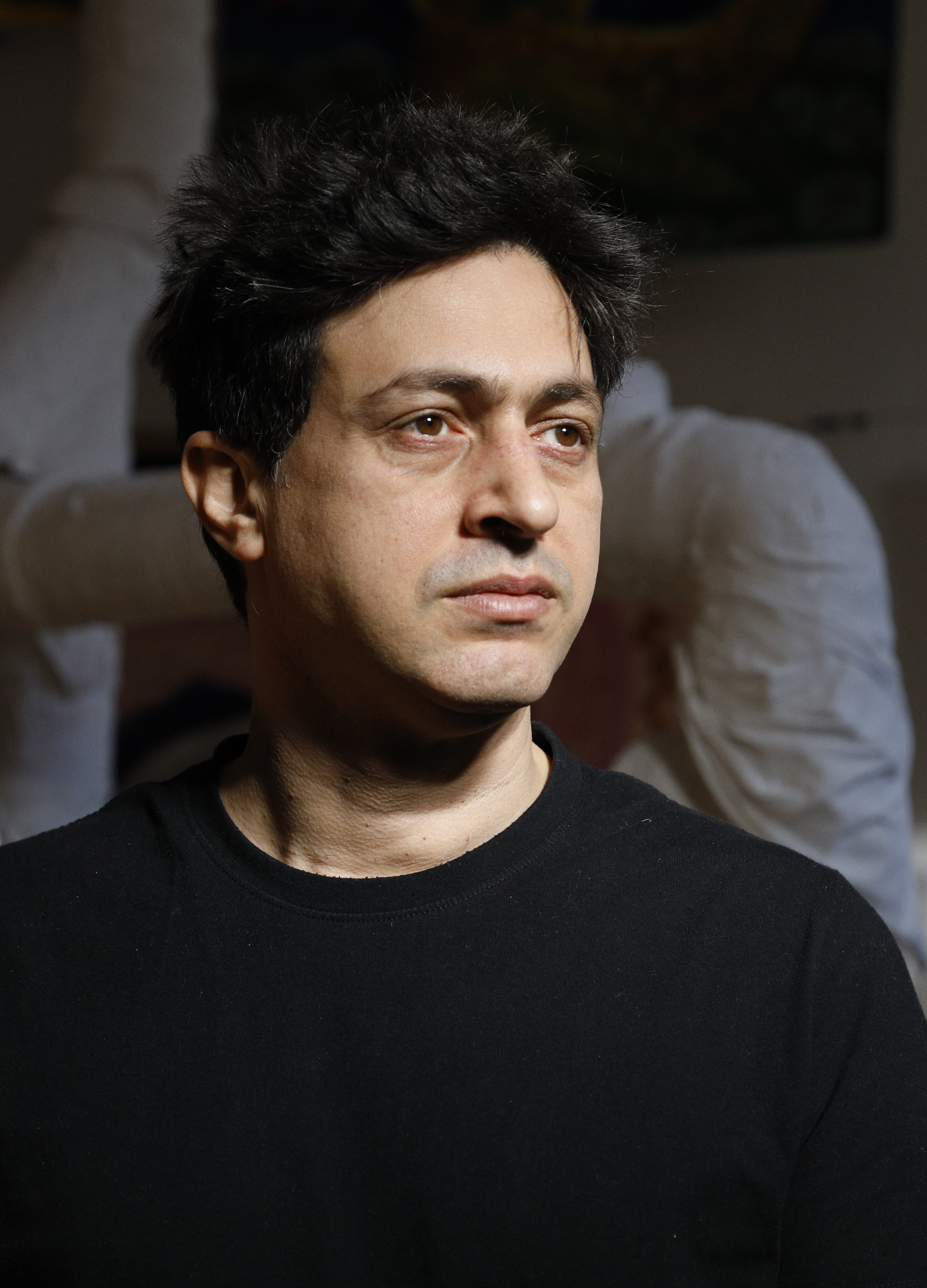
- Born: 1977 (age 48–49); Jerusalem, Israel
- Citizenship: Israeli
- Occupations: multimedia artist, painter, composer, guitarist
- Known for: large-scale installations, immersive performances, icon-sonic operas
- Notable work: "Fuga Perpetua", "Alma Mater", "Lessico Animale. Mysterion"
- Website: www.yuvalavital.com

Yuval Avital (Hebrew: יובל אביטל; born 1977) is a multimedia artist, composer, and guitarist based in Milan, Italy.

His installations and performances have been presented in prominent museums, biennials, opera houses and cultural institutions worldwide. Avital's multidisciplinary practice spans sound, visual art, performance, video-art and theater, often in collaboration with scientific institutes such as NASA, ethnographic archives, master craftsmen, traditional performers and entire urban communities. In 2016, his icon-sonic opera "Fuga Perpetua" received the sponsorship of the UNHCR.

== Biography ==
Yuval Avital was born in 1977 in Jerusalem, Israel. His works are developed in a variety of spaces, including public venues, industrial archaeological sites, theaters and museums.

Including monographic exhibitions, large-scale sound and video installations, and collective performances and compositions described as 'icon-sonic operas'. Composed for soloists, choirs, orchestras and ensembles, sometimes involving traditional masters of ancient cultures, dancers, performers and non-musicians. In addition to technological projects, with the participation of scientists and usage of artificial intelligence.

== Art ==
Avital's work spans a wide range of mediums, with the artistic intention of merging diverse art forms into unified, immersive experiences. He is known for his large-scale installations, performances, and musical compositions, which often explore themes of identity, memory, nature, and cultural dialogue. His works involve the integration of sound, visual art and performance.

=== Monographic exhibitions ===
- BOSCO DI LECCE (FOREST OF LECCE) – (19/11/2023 – 4/02/2024) – A relational art project that brings the artist and the city into dialogue in a process of collective creation, performances, art rituals, materio compositions and works conceived together with citizens and artisans, ideally transforming the inhabitants of Lecce into trees and the city into a human forest. The restitution of the process was presented as a monographic exhibition in MUST Museum in Lecce.
- LUCUS – (15/07/2023 – 7/01/2024) – Through ninety works, some of them created for the exhibition, Lucus, “the sacred forest”, unfolds in four moments between the spaces of the Biscozzi | Rimbaud Foundation in Lecce. Archaic forms, dreamlike drawings, technological plastic-sound assemblages, surreal plaster figurines and lightboxes suggest a metaphor of the Mediterranean landscape, lost but persistent in memory.
- ABOUT BIRDS – (23/03/2023 – 10/06/2023) – The exhibition presented in FMAV, Modena, was created in close correlation with the world premiere of the homonymous icon-sonic string quartet, conceived by Avital, that took place at the Pavarotti-Freni Municipal Theater in Modena. Among the numerous artworks on show, a series of watercolors depicting birds, created by the artist during the first lockdown and a photographic series depicting the performance that took place during the artistic seclusion in an old villa in the Modenese hills, where, under the artist's direction, Meitar Ensemble while learning the score, slowly experienced a metamorphosis into birds.
- LESSICO ANIMALE. MYSTERION – (25/02/2023 – 23/04/2023) – 2000 square meters exhibition inside the subterranean the Baths of Caracalla in Rome, presenting Lessico Animale, a cross-media art opus investigating the relationship between man and animal through the mediums of performance, video art, photography, sound sculptures and sound. Opening with two days of live performances in the spaces of the Mithreum, Lessico Animale. Mysterion ties in with the symbolism of the Mithra cult.
- MEMBRANE – (1/10/2022 – 13/11/2022) – The exhibition in the Chiostri di San Pietro in Reggio Emilia is the fourth of the meta-opera Il Bestiario della Terra (Reggio Parma Festival 2022) and represents the cry of the last man on Earth, adult and aware of his separation from the state of Nature. Membrane presents the 3 chapters of the opus Foreign Bodies through photography and 14 parallel projections in close dialogue with a visual apparatus composed of paintings, drawings and sound sculptures that are both an invitation to break the rigid boundaries between man and nature.
- PERSONA – (10/09/2022 – 30/10/2022) – The exhibition is a journey through the halls and collections of Palazzo Marchi, Parma, in which, in a dialogue with the space, the artist has created site-specific installations including a variety of artworks featuring Avital's Sonic Masks, sound art, video art, photography and performance.
- LESSICO ANIMALE. PROLOGO – (7/07/2022 – 16/10/2022) – The exhibition is part of “Il Bestiario della Terra” (Reggio Parma Festival 2022) and presents the creative process of Lessico Animale a complex exploration and investigation of the relationship between Man and Animality through video projections, photographic prints, plaster casts and other objects related to the performance which took place over six immersive days with nineteen actors from the Casa degli Artisti at the Teatro Due in Parma in May 2022.
- ANATOMIE SQUISITE – (8/06/2022 – 27/11/2022) – “Anatomie Squisite" is one of the four exhibition of “Il Bestiario della Terra” (Reggio Parma Festival 2022) created in close dialogue with the Reggio Emilia Civic Museums' collections, especially the Spallanzani Collection. It features Avital's "Cadavres Exquis”, hybrid and fantastical creatures in vivid colors, inspired by Surrealist games. These drawings lead to collaborative artworks with local artists, showcasing Avital's relational approach to art.
- HUMAN_SIGNS_LOOP/ED – (13-22/11/2021) – HUMAN SIGNS LOOP/ED is the first physical exhibition of HUMAN SIGNS since its creation during the first Covid-19 lockdown in March 2020. This global participatory voice and gesture artwork is presented on the occasion of LOOP Festival City Screen 2021 as an immersive polyptych installation with 7 parallel projections and a site-specific installation made of daily objects allowing viewers to merge into their own emotional worlds, surrounded by the choral work of 218 artists from over 50 countries.
- E T E R E – (8/04/22 – 26/06/2021) – E T E R E is an exhibition project specifically designed for the four floors of BUILDING that gathers more than a hundred works, many of them presented for the first time. It is a dream-like narrative divided into four sections, in which each space becomes a microcosm that encloses and reflects a defined environment, connected to the others by an upward path.
- ICON-SONIC POSTCARDS N.2 – POSTCARDS FROM ROME – (2018–2019) – The exhibition of Postcards from Rome presents all the material collected by Avital during the year long process in Macro Asilo (MACRO Museum of Contemporary Art Rome) through icon-sonic artwork divided into 7 chapters that recall the 7 Lightbox scores inside the exhibition. Each scene has been processed in terms of image and sound and related to the others up to a maximum of 9 scenes simultaneously.
- GRADES OF FOREIGNNESS V.2 – (3/07/2019 – 1/09/2019) – As main Installation of Ostrale Art Biennale in Dresden 2019 was made of two different but interconnected part: Lands v.2 and Foreign Bodies (n.1 Valle di Blenio, n.2 Saxony)
- NEPHILIM – (3/10/219 – 31/12/2019) – a solo exhibition of 60 Singing Masks sound sculptures created in dialogue with 24 Tuscan master artisans. Marino Marini Museum, Florence;
- VARIATIONS ON HARMONIC TREMOR: ICON-SONIC ETNA – (09/11/2017 – 30/11/2017) – exhibition of two installations with a video polyptych, a sound sculpture and hundreds of icon-sonic postcards. Hosted by the National Museum of Science and Technology "Leonardo da Vinci" in Milan, this exhibition is a tribute to the multifaceted perceived beauty of the territory around the Etna volcano, and to the people that have learnt how to co-exist with this tumultuous and incredible land.
- THREE GRADES OF FOREIGNNESS – (22/04/2017 – 30/09/2017) – exhibition of three installations with a video polyptych of 7 parallel video projections, a land installation, a sonic camera obscura and visual artworks. Extended over the 2300 square meters of the Fabbrica del Cioccolato Foundation in Switzerland, the exhibition explores the difficult relationship between man and nature, more specifically how they are alienated from one another, in conflict and then reunited.

=== Installations and permanent sculptures ===
- IL CANTO DELLO ZOOFORO – (10/06/2022 – 9/10/2022) – As the starting point of the macro-opera Il Bestiario della Terra (Reggio Parma Festival 2022) Avital has realised "Il canto dello Zooforo”, an unprecedented icon-sonic installation for the Casa del Suono in Parma. The composition is strongly inspired by the bas-reliefs of Benedetto Antelami's Zooforo carved on the walls of the Baptistery of Parma.
- LULLABIES FOR THE LAND, Piazza Castello, Torino, Italy, 2022; Teatro Franco Parenti, Milan, Italy, 2022
- MEDITERRANEAN ALTAR N.2, Centre Des Arts – Ecole Internationale de Genève, 2019. Installation for sonic grains, loudspeakers, ventilators, straw, and light.
- THE RATTLES GARDEN – permanent sound sculptures. A 1500-square-meter kinetic sound-art work featuring hundreds of bells and rattles from Mediterranean lands on wheat-like metallic sculptures. Played by the wind and visitors, it creates a contemporary yet ancestral symbol. This participative sound sculpture embodies Mediterranean traditions, rebirth, and collective responsibility, uniting the diverse voices of the sea connecting three continents. Created in collaboration with Cittadellarte Fondazione Pistoletto at Mulinum San Floro, Catanzaro, Italy - 2019.
- LANDS – ring of loudspeakers and soil. The second installation of Avital's Three Grades of Foreignness.
- REH'EM – sonic camera obscura. Third installation of Avital's Three Grades of Foreignness, it was realised in an old elevator shaft, filled with sounds of the heartbeats of Avital's newborn and seismic vibrations of the earth.
- OPEN FENCE – permanent sound sculpture: 12 tons of weight, 64 meters of length, 4 meters of height, over 320 tubular bells. Inauguration: 21 June 2017 at the East End Studios of Milan.
- FIELDS, Bergamo, Frankfurt, 2016. Multiple loudspeakers, in collaboration with Architettura Sonora and Catellani & Smith. Premiere: I Maestri del Paesaggio, Piazza Vecchia & Giardino Tresoldi, Bergamo, Italy 05-20 September 2015.
- ALMA MATER – in dialogue with “Il Terzo Paradiso” by Michelangelo Pistoletto: massive sonic work consisting of a forest of 140 loudspeakers, legendary étoiles of Teatro alla Scala and lacemakers. First edition under the patronage of EXPO 2015 and the city of Milan, July 8 – August 29, La Fabbrica del Vapore, Milan, Italy. Duration: unlimited.
- SPACE UNFOLDED, BergamoScienza, Bergamo, 2012. Concert for electric guitar, live electronics, video and sonic translations of the cosmic space, in collaboration with NASA and ESA scientists.

=== Performance ===
- FOREIGN BODIES ACTION: Triennale, Milan, 2024, Gwangju Biennial, KR, 2023 – ETERE, Building Milan, 2021 - Woolbridge Gallery, Biella, Italy, 2020 - Dresden Biennial Ostrale, 2019 - .
- LESSICO ANIMALE. MYSTERION: three days of live performances in the spaces of the Mithreum, Baths of Caracalla, Rome, Italy, 2023
- LESSICO ANIMALE. PROLOGO: performance which took place over six immersive days with nineteen actors from the Casa degli Artisti at the Teatro Due in Parma in May 2022.
- RIVERS: performance for a vocal crowd of refugees and loudspeakers. Premiere: Opening of Terzo Paradiso Center by Michelangelo Pistoletto, Biella, Italy 26 September 2015; Museo Marino Marini, Florence, Italy 4 May 2019; GAM - Torino and Barriera di Milano, Turin, Italy 29–30 September 2020. Palazzo Marchi, Parma, Italy September 2022. Duration: unlimited.
- HUMAN SIGNS - LIVE GRID: MANIFESTA 13 – Piazza Castello, Turin, Italy, 2021; Casa degli Artisti, Milan, Italy, 2021; Suzanne Dellal Centre for Dance and Theater, Tel Aviv, Israel, 2020; Donco, St. Petersburg, Russia, 2020; Union Street, New York, USA, 2020
- FOLD: Castelvecchio di Rocca Barbena, IT 2021; Mulinum San Floro, Catanzaro, Italy, 2019
- THIRD PARADISE SCORE, Cittadellarte – Fondazione Pistoletto, Biella, Italy, 2017
- PACKMAN VS ESCHER, Biarteca festival, Biella, Italy, 2006–2007

=== Large-scale projects ===
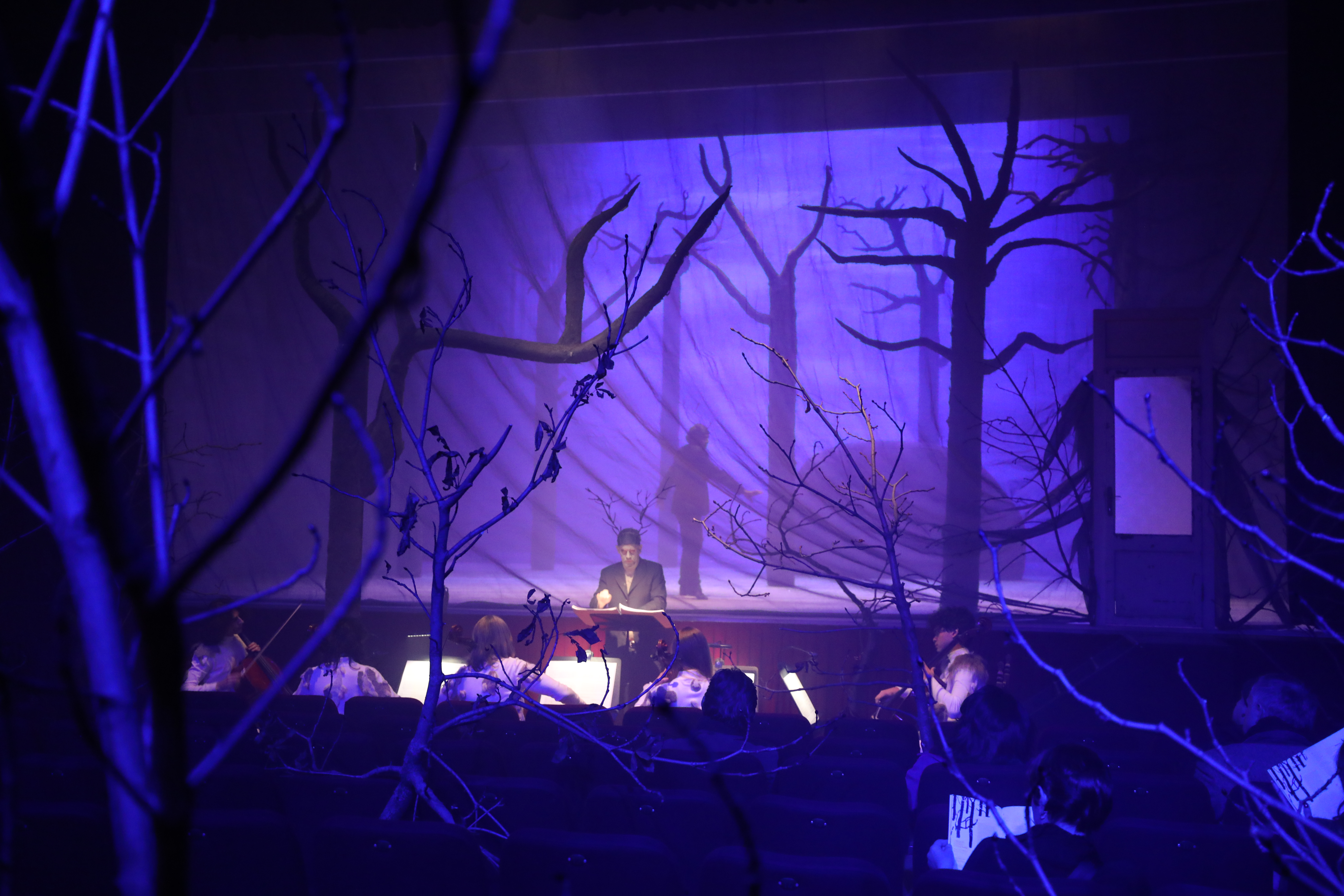
Yuval Avital, The Forest of Cernunnos, 2022

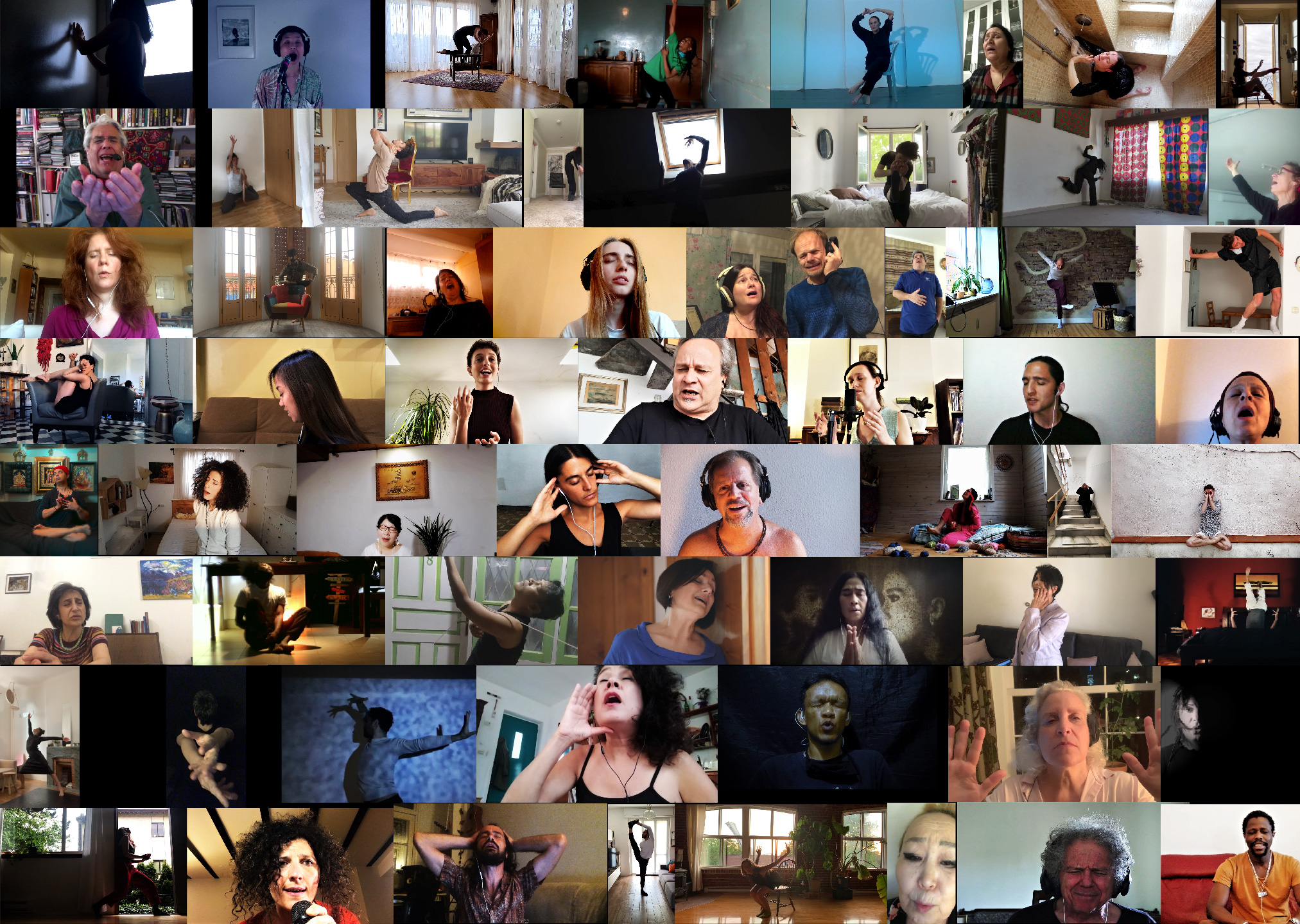
Yuval Avital, Human Signs, Collage, 2020

- MOSTRARIO is an artistic takeover of the three main theaters and opera houses in Parma and Reggio Emilia (Teatro Regio, Parma, Italy, Teatro Due, Parma, Italy, Teatro Valli, Reggio Emilia, Italy), transforming their complex architecture to multi sensory bestiary using a vast range of works spanning between theatrical, installation, sonic, and visual art forms. In this work, Avital builds a personal “bestiary” composed of eighteen scenes across three chapters in different venues. Through fantastical and imaginary figures, this immersive “art-ritual” confronts some of the most urgent issues in modern times, seeking authentic work through action.
- HUMAN SIGNS – Global Multimedia Participatory artwork of voice and gesture—with over 200 artists from over 50 countries, presented online through audiovisual ensembles on different formats and platforms, March 2020 – ongoing. Opening at MANIFESTA 13 Biennial, Real Utopias exhibition as “A Door to Human Signs” (2020, Marseille).

== Music ==
Avital's compositions and stage works include 6 chamber Operas (coined by the artist as Icon-Sonic Operas), large scale works involving tens and sometimes hundreds of performers (coined by the artist as Massive Sonic Works) quartets, orchestral works and chamber music, often with strong multimedia components. These works have been presented at opera houses, venues, and festivals, including the Parma Opera House Teatro Regio, Teatro Due Parma, National Conservatory of China, Tel Aviv Museum, and the Warsaw Autumn Festival, along with ensembles and soloists such as PMCE Parco della Musica Contemporanea Ensemble, Tempo Reale Ensemble, Meitar Ensemble, Auditivvokal Dresden, and Quartetto Lyskamm.

Some of Avital's works are dedicated to humanitarian issues. These include his opera Fuga Perpetua (2016) whose protagonists are refugees, which is endorsed by United Nations UNHCR; and his Opera Giobbe [Job, 2018 ] (איוב), commissioned by the Italian Government and the Italian the chairmanship of the IHRA (International Holocaust Remembrance Alliance) in occasion of the 80th anniversary of the promulgation of the racial laws, In which he connected the Holocaust to the genocides which followed afterwards till today.

In his compositions, Avital often includes important carriers of non-western traditions (such as Samaritans, gong and bamboo ensembles of South-East Asia, nomads of Kazakhstan and many others), as well as vocal communities of non-musicians (coined by the artists as ‘Crowd Music’), collaborations with scientists from institutes such as NASA, ESA, INGV and with ethnographic and ethnomusicological archives.

=== Massive Sonic Works ===
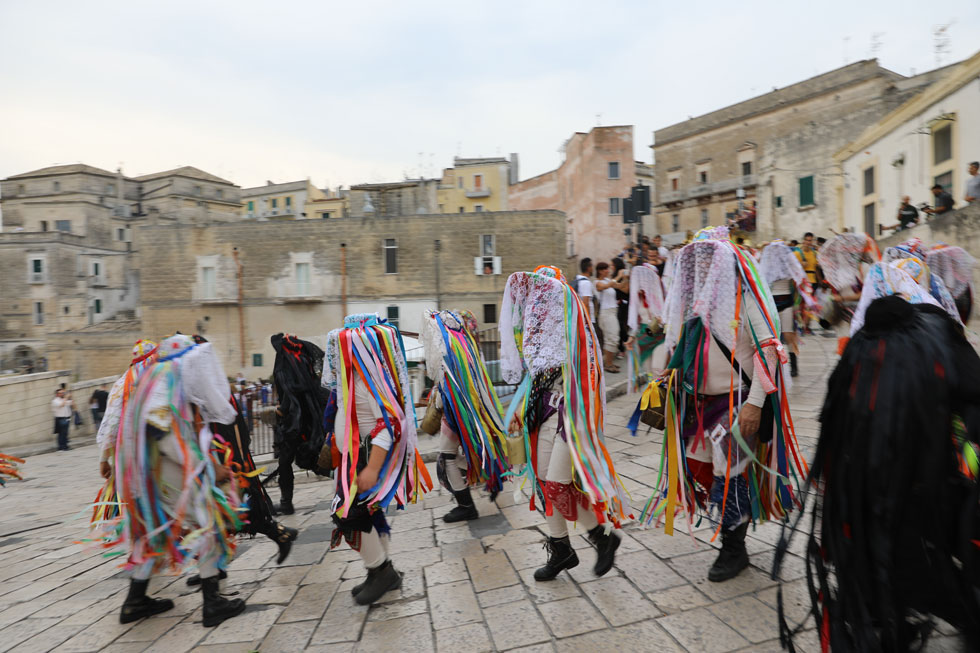
Urla, 2019

- URLA – Massive sonic work N.6, Geographic musical score for over 300 traditional and contemporary musicians of Basilicata region, electronic and theatrical actions. Open Sound Festival – Matera European Capital of Culture 2019, September 2019.
- REQUIEM MONUMENTALE: PART I – two parallel compositions: choir of 14 voices and marching brass band of 100 elements. Commissioned by Amici del Monumentale. Premiere: 14 May 2017, Monumental Cemetery of Milan.
- REKA – massive sonic work n.4. For six traditional singers, two percussions and a crowd of hundreds of people. Commissioned by Warsaw Autumn Festival. Premiere: September 2014 | MITO SettembreMusica & Warsaw Autumn Festivals | Milan, Italy & Warsaw, Poland. Duration: 70–75 minutes.
- KARAGATAN – massive sonic work n.3. For 100 traditional gong & bamboo performers. Premiere: 21/01/2013 | Closing concert of Tunog Tugan Festival| Dipolog City| Mindanao, Philippines. Conductor: Chino Toledo. Duration: 30–40 minutes.
- GARON – massive sonic work n.2. For 40 tubas, 5 contrabass tuba soloists, 6 percussions, choir, extended vocal technique soloists & live electronics. (2012), a dialogue between instruments that amplify spectator's experience, dedicated to Anish Kapoor. Duration – 57 minutes approx. Premiere : 26/01/2012 | Closing concert Dirty corner by Anish Kapoor | La Fabbrica del Vapore | Milan, Italy. Conductors: Sandro Gorli, Dario Garegnani, Elena Casella.
- MISE EN ABÎME – massive sonic work n.1. For a crowd of 100 people, 34 accordions, 2 bass tuba, bass clarinet, soprano, percussions, didgeridoo & four conductors (2011). Premiere: March 2011 | Recording in RAI (Italian National Broadcast Network) studios in Milan, Italy. Conductors: Sandro Gorli, Pilar Bravo, Nicola Scaldaferri, Dario Garegnani. Duration: 70 minutes.

=== Icon-Sonic Works ===
==== Icon-Sonic Operas ====
- JOB: icon-sonic Opera N.6, for String quintet (2 violins, viola, 2 cellos), 5 soloist voices (2 soprano, tenor, 2 basses), 2 percussions, 3 cantors of the 3 monotheistic religions, live electronics 2 narrators and visuals; Performing: PMCE Parco della Musica Contemporanea Ensemble. Conductor: Tonino Battista and Auditivvokal Dresden. conductor: Olaf Katzer Libretto by: Haim Baharier and Magda Poli. Duration: 85 minutes. Terme di Diocleziano, Rome, Italy, 2018
- FUGA PERPETUA: icon-sonic Opera for an ensemble, visuals, mobile sound theater and a vocal crowd. Performing: Meitar Ensemble, with the sponsorship of UNHCR and of the International Theater Institute, UNESCO. Duration: 82 minutes. Premiere: Teatro Comunale “L. Pavarotti” Modena, Italy 12 March 2016. UK Premieres: Brighton Festival, Brighton, May 2016 and NEAT Festival, Nottingham, May 2016.
- NOISE FOR SYD: icon/sonic opera N.4 for 7 musicians, light designer, visual artist, 2 dancers, video & electronics. Premiere: Festival Aperto, Cavalerizza reale, Reggio Emilia, Italy, 2013. Duration: 30 minutes.
- LEILIT: nocturno icon/sonic opera N.3 for a recorders consort: contrabass in F, bass in C, bass in F, tenor, soprano & 2 sopranino; accordion consort (7 elements); piano; bowed piano; guitar soloist; 2 Keis cantors & Video (2011). Duration: 40 minutes.
- SAMARITANS: icon/sonic opera N.2, for a soloists ensemble, Samaritans choir, video & electronics. Conductor: Massimo Mazza. Premiere: MiTo SettembreMusica Festival, Teatro Nuovo, Milan, Italy, September 2010.
- KOLOT: icon/sonic opera N.1, for 12 traditional singers, soloists ensemble, video & electronics. Premiere: Opening event of REC festival, Cavalerizza reale, Reggio Emilia, Italy; Teatro dal Verme, Milan, Italy; opening event of the XXVI edition of the European Theater Festival, Teatro Due, Parma, Spazio Grande Teatro 2 Parma, Italy 2008. Conductors: Yuval Avital, Nori Jacoby. Duration: 70 minutes.

==== Icon-Sonic Quartet ====
- ABOUT BIRDS: icon-sonic string quartet N.2, for a String quartet with live electronics, live performance, live video projection (back screen), software programming. Premiere: L'Altro suono Festival - Modena UNESCO City of Media Arts, Teatro Comunale “L. Pavarotti” Modena, Italy, 2023. Performing: Meitar Ensemble.
- SILENT QUARTET: icon-sonic opera for a string quartet and video art. Performing: Quartetto Lyskamm. Duration: 60 minutes. Premiere: Anteo spazioCinema, 31 May 2016, Milan, Italy.

==== Icon-Sonic Orchestras ====
- OTOT: icon-sonic symphony for extended chamber orchestra, 5 percussions, 3 accordions, visuals & live electronics. World premiere: opening of the symphonic season of Teatro Sociale di Como, Italy, January 2013. Duration: 55–65 minutes.

==== Icon-Sonic Chambers ====
- Utopie N.1 for percussions, video & Tape. Premiere: Conservatorio G. Verdi, Milan, Italy. 04/09/2013. Performing: Lorenzo Colombo. Duration: 27 minutes.
- Unfolding Space: Concerto for electric & classic guitar, live electronics, video and sonic translations of the cosmic space. In collaboration with NASA & ESA scientists. Duration 60 minutes. Premiere BergamoScienza, Italy, October 2012. Duration 60 minutes.
- KANAF for Bass clarinet, tape & live electronics (2011–13). Premiere: Spain 2015. Performing: Paolo de Gaspari. Duration: 21 minutes.

=== Chamber music ===
- Music for 7 N.1 – "Cycles" for seven tenor recorders ensemble. In memory of Jose Monserrat Maceda. Premiere: RomaEuropa Festival, Teatro Palladium, Rome, Italy, October 2011. Performing: The Running Seven Recorders Ensemble. Duration: 17 minutes.
- Music for 7 N.2 – "Modus benedictus" for seven cellos. In memory of Nusrat Fateh Ali Khan, 2009. Unperformed works. Duration: 22 minutes approx.
- Music for 7 N.3 – "Un porto griggio" for seven contrabass tuba. Dedicated to Bjork (2009/2014). Conductor: Antonio Macciomei. Premiere: 4° Italian Low Brass Festival, Auditorium G.Verdi, Segrate, Italy, April 2014. Duration: 30 minutes.
- Music for 7 N.4 – "Al mishkavi" for 7 copper plates and seven voices. Dedicated to Shlomo Avital (2008 - 2009). Unperformed works. Duration: 27 minutes approx.
- Music for 7 N.5 – "Sunset" for 7 violins. In memory of Abel Ehrlich (2010). Unperformed works. Duration: 22 minutes approx.
- Music for 7 N.6 – "Horror vacui" for seven accordions. Dedicated to Pauline Oliveros (2011). Premiere: RomaEuropa Festival, Teatro Palladium, Roma, Italy, October 2011. Performing: Sergio Scappini, Michele Bracciali, Nadio Marenco, Giancarlo Calabria, Augusto Comminesi, Paolo Vignani. Duration: 15.30 minutes.
- HORIZON & SIREN for alto sax & viola. Premiere: Cantiere Internazionale d'Arte, Montepulciano, Italy July 2015. Duration: 25 minutes.
- HORIZON & SIREN V.2 for alt sax and baritone sax, live electronics. World Premiere: Festival AngelicA 2020 Centro di Ricerca Musicale - Auditorium San Leonardo Bologna.
- MULTIPLICATIONS N.1 for viola, Saxophone, Percussions, analogue synthesizer & live mixing. Commission: Tempo Reale Premiere: Closing event of Tempo Reale Festival, Florence, Italy 10 October 2015. Duration: 21+ minutes.
- BDIDUT for scordatura guitar. Premiere. Toronto Performing Arts Center, George Washington hall, Canada, October, 2007. Duration: 12 minutes.
- DIMDUM for bass flute (2010). Premiere: Frazione Saliana, Pianello del Lario, Como, 2011. Soloist: Gianluigi Nuccini. Duration: 17 minutes.
- DREAM, SHADOWS AND PASSAGES, piano sonata (2010-2011). Premiere: RomaEuropa Festival, Teatro Palladium, Roma, Ottobre 2011. Performing: Maria Grazia Bellocchio. Duration: 21 minutes.

=== Compositions for indigenous ensembles ===
Avital's works for indigenous ensembles involve contemporary music and ancient traditions. These include:

- Slow Horizons: music for 12 Kazakh indigenous players, storyteller, 2 dancers, Almaty, Kazakhstan, "Nauryz 21" Central Asia 21 century music in May 2006.
- After the darkness: closing event for the 2nd International Rondalla Festival, Bogio, Philippines, February 2007. Yuval Avital – composition, direction, Yizhar Karshon – harpsichord; male choir, indigenous gongs & bamboo ensemble from the town of Bogio.
- Lefkara Moirai: for traditionals ensemble, 2 singers, guitar, 12 craftsmen, video, narrator, and live electronics. Premiere: Lefkara Festival, Lefkara, Cyprus 2009.

=== Electro-acoustic composition ===
- Theatrum Mundi by Daniel Libeskind and “Meditations on Theatrum Mundi” by Yuval Avital, London Design Festival, MSCTY EXPO, 12–20 September 2020.
- Yom (2007)
- Ensof (2007)
- Shir leShlomo (2014)

=== Music for Dance/Theater ===
- Bdidut: with choreographer & Dancer Chiara Rosenthal, Insoliti International Festival and the XXVII International Review of Integrated Arts and Dance “Il gesto e l'anima”, Teatro nuovo, Turin, Italy 2004.
- Hamesh: for two actors, guitar, percussions, winds and electronic music (composed by Y.A, texts curated by A. Mazzolotti), World Premiere: 4 September 2005, Vercelli, Italy.
- Music for choreography of Cave Canem by Avi kaisere and Sergio Antonino, for guitar, electronics and dancer choir. Germany, 2007.
- Music for the theater show "L’ultimo viaggio di Sinbad" by Erri De Luca, Italy, 2009. Live electronics. Director: Marcello Zagaria. Premiere “Festa del teatro 2009” – IV edition, Spazio MIL, Milan, Italy.
- Corpo: installation for two dancers, video & live electronics, Fondazione A. Pomodoro, Milan, Italy, 2010.
- Music for the theater show "Una notte in Tunisia" by Vitaliano Trevisan. Director: Andrée Ruth Shammah. Italy, 2011.

== Guitar ==
Avital graduated in the Jerusalem Music Academy, and later from Angelo Gilardino's soloists class, under the tutorship of M° Angelo Gilardino & M° Luigi Biscaldi. He then started focusing on creating his own original compositions and on collaborations with masters and soloists of both creative and traditional music. Avital uses elements from the tradition of stringed instruments in the Middle East, Central Asia and Far East, combined with extended techniques for classical guitar.

== Music collaborations ==
Yuval Avital's work is focused on the research of intercultural relations. Avital's operas blend aspects of non-western musical cultures, traditional artists, and the music of ancient cultures around the world. His research of new forms of musical expressions through dialogue led to the creation of Trialogo Festival in 2006.

== Bibliography ==
- Borio, Gianmario; Scaldaferri, Nicola (2015), "21", Musical Listening in the Age of Technological Reproduction, Musical Cultures of the Twentieth Century, vol. 1, Pavia: University of Pavia and Giorgio Cini Foundation, ASHGATE, pp. 373–393, ISBN 9781472442178
- C. Cupchik, Gerald (2016), "Creative Practices of Contemporary Artists: Yuval Avital", The Aesthetics of Emotion: Up the Down Staircase of the Mind-Body, Cambridge University Press, ISBN 978-1-107-02445-8
