= Myrna Bustani =

Lebanese businesswoman (born 1937)

Myrna Bustani ميرنا البستاني
- Born: December 20, 1937 (age 88); Beirut, Lebanon
- Education: University of Lyon
- Occupations: Businesswoman, former Parliamentarian, philanthropist
- Term: 1963–1964
- Spouse: Fouad El Khazzen (m. 1954; div. 1970)
- Children: 2
- Parent(s): Emile Bustani; Laura Bustani
- Relatives: Boustani family (distant)

Myrna Emile Bustani (Arabic: ميرنا إميل البستاني; born 20 December 1937) is a Lebanese businesswoman, philanthropist, socialite and former parliamentarian. Daughter of Emile Bustani, she was the first woman to serve in the Lebanese parliament (1963-1964) after she took charge of representing her father's parliament seat upon his death in 1963. Bustani is a big contributor towards cultural events in Lebanon and a patron of the arts. She is a chairperson of the Al Bustan International Festival in Lebanon.

== Biography ==
=== Early life ===
Myrna Bustani was born in Beirut on December 20, 1937 to Emile and Laura Bustani. Her parents courted at the Grand Hotel in Beit Mery during the 1930s prior to their marriage. Emille would years later buy the same building in auction, that would later be transformed into the Al Bustan hotel. Emile headed the leading engineering and contracting firm in the Arab world and was a prominent Lebanese statesman. Laura was an accomplished choir singer and pianist, and instilled in Myrna a passion for classical compositions. Laura frequenty took her two children to concerts in Beirut during their youth.

=== Education ===
Myrna Bustani attended Collège Protestant Français and in addition for 10 years received formal piano lessons from in Beirut. She attended a finishing school in London and completed her training there in 1954. She studied at the University of Lyon in France, where she graduated in 1958 with a BSc degree in Psychology.

Aside from her native Lebanese Arabic, Bustani is also fluent in French and English.

== Career ==
=== Politics ===
In 1963, her father, Emile Bustani, died in an airplane crash. He was considered to be one of the most influential businessmen and philanthropists in the Middle East and a leading figure in the politics of the region at the time. He had been a member of the Lebanese parliament since 1951. Upon his death, Myrna was elected to succeed him and thus became the first woman to serve in the Lebanese parliament.

=== Business ===
After her father's death, Bustani not only inherited his parliament seat but also his business positions at various companies and other responsibilities, including project plans.

==== Al Bustan Hotel ====
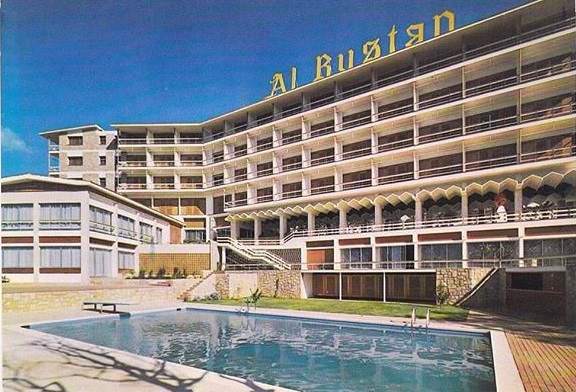
Al Bustan hotel, 1970

Prior to his death, Emile Bustani had purchased the former hotel where he and his wife used to go dancing before they married in the 1930s. He had bought the building with the intention of developing it. In order for redevelopment to happen, they needed to demolish the old hotel. Construction for the new hotel started in 1962. Emile died before its completion. However, his wife and daughter continued the development of the project.

By 1967, the hotel was officially completed and ready for its grand opening. Bustani's mother chose the name "Al Bustan" (The Garden) – it was the first hotel of the time to take an Arabic name, when Beirut's hotels all took European names. The Al Bustan would become an important Lebanese landmark.

== Philanthropy ==
In 1985, she established the Emile Bustani Middle East Seminar at her father's American alma mater, MIT, to honour his memory and pursue his devotion to higher education and peace in the region. Bustani has been a member of the AUB Board of Trustees since 1979.

=== Patron of the arts ===
In 2007, according to an interview she did for Bespoke Magazine (online publication), she described her greatest calling as the struggle to revitalize and educate her sceptical countrymen about symphonies and sonatas, despite rampant economic instability, political assassinations and general unrest.

In 1993, she set up the Al Bustan Festival, which has since welcomed hundreds of local and international musicians and performers.

== Awards ==
- Order of the Cedar (officer), Lebanon
- Merite Culturel, Ministry of Arts of The Polish Republic
- Golden Insignia of the Republic of Austria
- Commander of the Isabel la Catholique, Spain
