= Yury Revich =

Russian-born Austrian classical violinist and composer (born 1991)

- Юрий Ревич
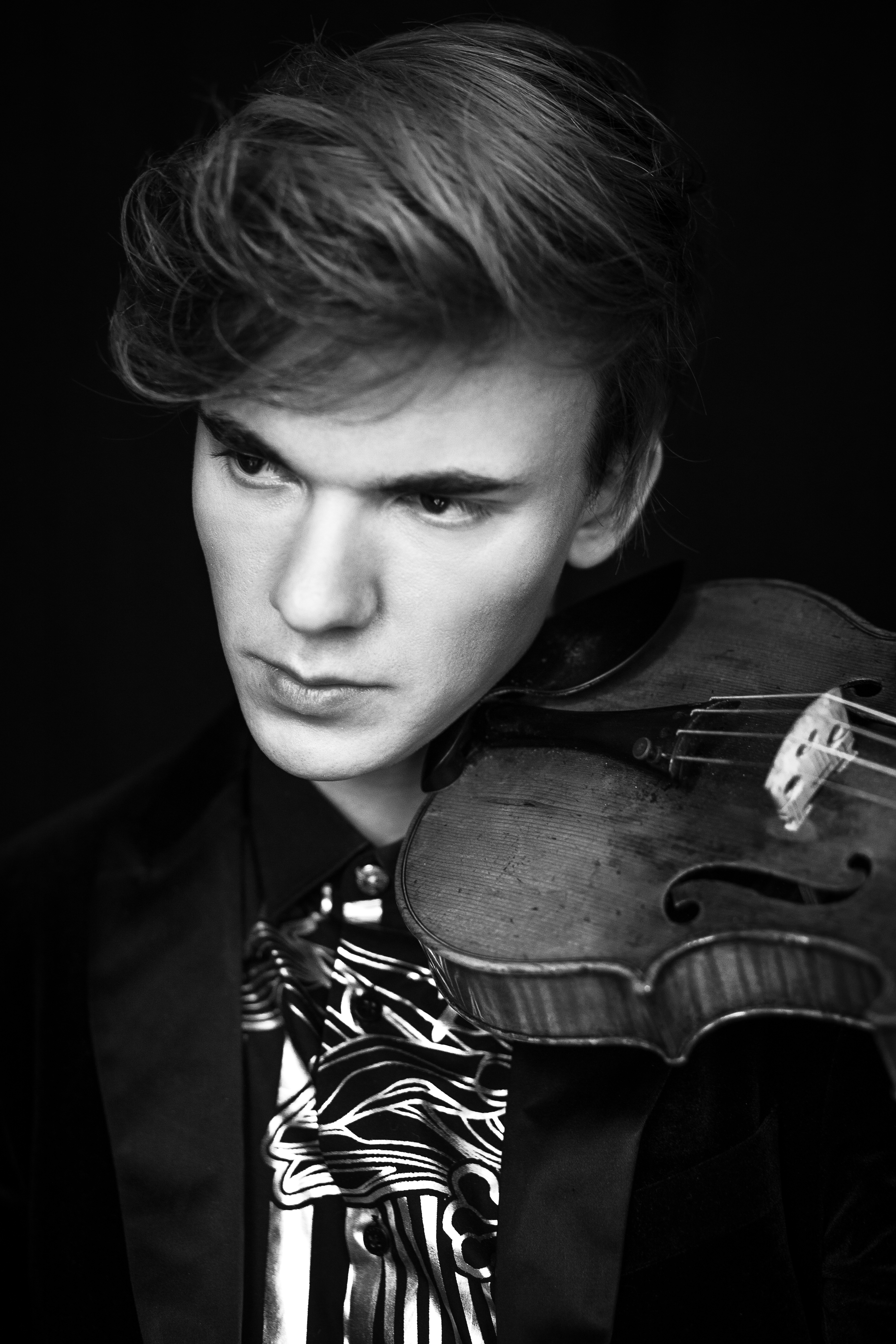
- Born: 28 August 1991 (age 35); Moscow, Russian SFSR, Soviet Union
- Occupations: Classical violinist and composer
- Years active: 1991–present
- Awards: ECHO Klassik Award "Newcomer of the Year 2016" Young Artist of the Year 2015 by the International Classical Music Awards.
- Website: www.yuryrevich.com

Yury Revich (Russian: Юрий Александрович Ревич; born 28 August 1991) is a Russian-born Austrian classical violinist and composer. He was named the Young Artist of the Year in 2015 by the International Classical Music Awards (ICMA) and the 2016 ECHO Klassik "Newcomer of the year (violin)" award. He plays on a Stradivari 1709 violin on loan from the Goh Family Foundation.

== Life and career ==
Born in Moscow, Revich studied with Galina Turchaninovoy from 2005 to 2009, with Victor Pikaizen, and since 2009 with Pavel Vernikov at the Konservatorium Wien. Amongst his other awards are Man of The Year by LOOK in Austria and Bernsteingeiger Award by Beethoven Center Vienna. His recording of music by Chevalier de Saint-Georges was listed in Billboard Top 100 Classical Charts and is part of the soundtrack of the Bridgerton series on Netflix. He was a scholarship holder of the Mstislav Rostropovich Foundation, participated in the International Charity Funds of Nahum Guzik and Vladimir Spivakov. In May 2009, he made his debut with Daniil Trifonov at New York's Carnegie Hall.

He runs his International Multidisciplinary Festival "Festival Nights with Yury Revich" (Formerly known as Friday Nights with Yury Revich) and Project "Dreamland" and works with musicians and artists from different genres such as Martha Argerich, Ute Lemper, Steven Isserlis, William Orbit, Rupert Everett, Amos Gitai, Andrea Bocelli, Pixie Lott, Sunnyi Melles and Philipp Hochmair, Gabriel Prokofiev and others.

He has performed at international Festivals, such as the Verbier Festival, Cannes Film Festival, Sommets Musicaux de Gstaad, Rheingau Musik Festival, Al Bustan Festival in Beirut, Festival Radio France Occitanie Montpellier, Festival della Valle D'Itria in Martina Franca, Aurora Music Festival, Festspiele Mecklenburg-Vorpommern, Vladimir Spivakov's Festival in Colmar (France), the Rostropovich Festival in Baku (Azerbaijan), the Rome Chamber Music Festival, Liana Isakadze's Festival in Batumi (Georgia), the Festival of music in Kaunas (Lithuania), and the Eilat Festival in Israel.

Revich has received several awards at international competitions for young musicians – in particular, the first prize at the International Violin Competition "Virtuosi of the 21st Century" in Moscow. French master luthier Alain Carbonare presented Revich with a Carbonare violin. He won the first prize of the Guzik Foundation.

Named as "New Paganini" by medias, in 2013 The Strad wrote:

"Yury Revich performs the outer movements of Andreas's Third Violin Concerto op.46 with full-blooded authority, fleet-fingered dexterity, innate musicality and substantial accuracy..."

The journalist Natalia Kolesova wrote in 2001:

In his performance of Basque Capriccio by Sarasate you heard drama, passion and courageous rigor. Gloss playing a young violinist once again proved that in the world of music maturity comes not with age, and responds to the depth of feelings.

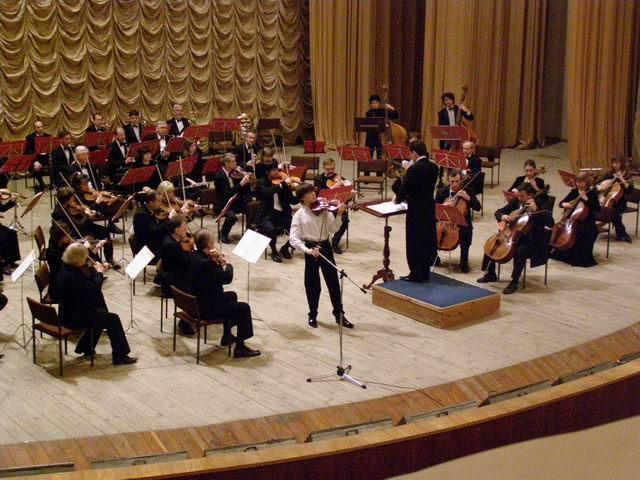
Yury Revich performs Paganini 2nd Concerto

He first played at Zurich Tonhalle and La Scala in Milan (Italy) in 2013, performing Tchaikovsky's Violin Concerto with the Orchestra Sinfonica di Milano Giuseppe Verdi conducted by Zhang Xion. Since then he plays as a solo violinist in venues like Golden Hall of Musikverein in Vienna, Berlin Philharmonic Hall, Salle Pleyel, Bozar in Brussels and others.

As a composer some of the performances of his original works include:

- Composer solo debut in Salle Pleyel, Paris, 2024
- Premiere of "Unity" in the Golden Hall of Musikverein Vienna, 2023
- Premiere of the First Violin Concerto "Awakening" in Salzburg, 2022
- Premiere of the First Symphony "Kaleidoscope" in London, 2023
- Art Basel Paris+, 2023 (as both composer and artistic director of the multidisciplinary project UNITY)
- The Cannes Film Festival, 2023 and 2024
- Liszt Festival Austria, 2023
- Main stage of the World Expo Dubai. 2021 (as both composer and artistic director)
- United Nations Environment Program Earth Day (composing piece for 100 musicians from around the world), 2021
- With Munich Symphony Orchestra and Berlin Symphony Orchestra, 2023

He records for Sony Classical, ARS, Odradek and onepoint.fm.

In 2015 Revich launched a new international multidisciplinary concert cycle in Vienna "Friday Nights with Yury Revich". Since 2023 the project has been renamed into multidisciplinary Festival Nights with Yury Revich In June 2015 he organized the First Gala Concert in Vienna "All for Autism" to support the Austrian Center for Autism (Österreichische Autistenhilfe). He is an honorary representative for UNICEF Austria.

in 2022 and 2023 Revich was performing at the Oslo Freedom Forum

== Recordings ==
- Russian Soul – with Valentina Babor (piano), 2012, Ars Produktion 1008420 OCLC 1184485170
- Andreas Romberg: 3 Violin Sonatas, Op.32 – 2013, Sony Classical Switzerland G010002935153N OCLC 1416853964
- Romberg: Concertos 2013, Sony Classical Switzerland OCLC 1376138815
- Mozart and Sarasate 2014, OnePoint.FM OCLC 1122932561
- 8 Seasons 2015, Ars Produktion 38170 OCLC 942778733
- Steps through the Centuries 2015, Odradek Records 0855317003103 OCLC 1011125818
- Joseph Boulogne, Chevalier De Saint-Georges: Symphonies Concertantes, 2021 Naxos OCLC 1295012475
- Doderer: Symphony No. 2, DWV 93 "Bohinj" & Violin Concerto No. 2, DWV 62b "In Breath of Time" 2015, Capriccio 2015 OCLC 954342472

Original music by Yury Revich is released under his project name OLARIO.

He composed music for a few film projects, for example INCOMPLETE produced by Oren Moverman.
