= Beit Mery =

Beit Mery بيت مري
- City
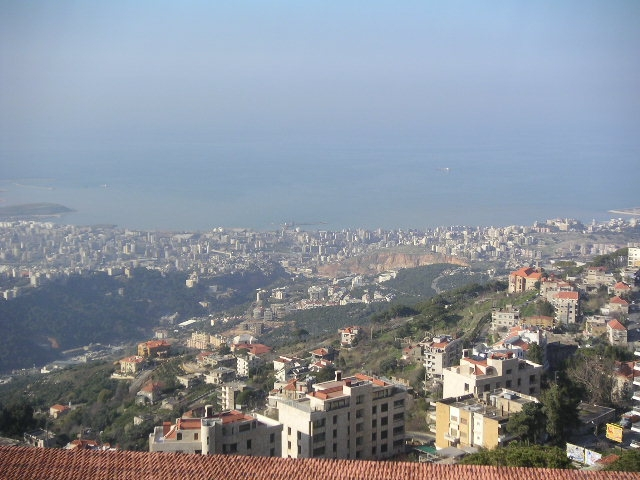
- View over the hill

- Location within Lebanon
- Coordinates: 33.8656°N 35.5953°E
- Country: Lebanon
- Governorate: Mount Lebanon Governorate
- District: Matn District
- Elevation: 800 m (2,600 ft)
- Time zone: UTC+2 (EET)
  - Summer (DST): UTC+3 (EEST)
- Dialing code: +961-4-

Beit Mery (Arabic: بيت مري ; also Beit Mer, Beir Meri) is a Lebanese town overlooking the capital Beirut. The town has been a summer mountain resort since the times of the Phoenicians and later the Romans.

The name derives from Aramaic and means "The house of my Lord". On one of the three hills of Beit Mery (Southern end of town) along the Lebanon Western mountain range are the ruins of the old Phoenician and Roman temples that were erected in the same general area in what is now known as Deir El-Qala'a (دير القلعة).

At present, a Christian church and monastery sit on top of parts of the old Roman temple. Les Scouts Du Liban Groupe Sainte Marie Beit Mery is one of the biggest movement in town and it is located in College des Freres since 1969. Beit Mery is home to a Lebanese Red Cross First Aid Center.

== Culture ==
The town is the site of the annual Al Bustan festival, held in the theatre of the Al Bustan Hotel.

== Demography ==
The residents of Beit Mery are mainly Christian, (predominantly Maronite Catholic, with a significant minority of Greek Orthodox, Greek Catholic and Armenian Orthodox), and Druze.

== Geography ==
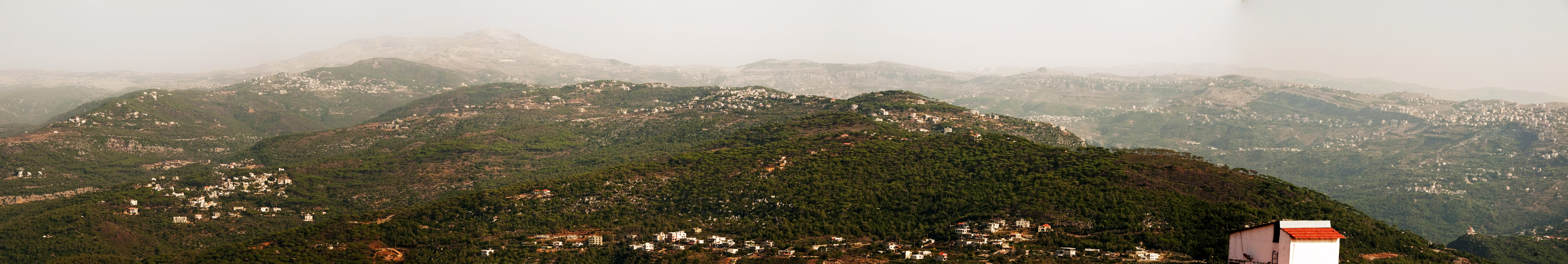
Panoramic photo from Beir Mery (2009)

Beit Mery occupies a hill, 700–750 meters (2,300–2,460 ft) above sea level, which gives the town views of the Beirut peninsula and part of Lebanon's Mediterranean coast. It has an area of 5.48 km^{2} (2.12 sq mi). Since 2000 Beit Mery started to be a suburban town and is 16 km (9.9 mi) away from Beirut.

== History ==
Beit Mery's history dates back to ancient times. The town is home to the ruins of a Roman temple, indicating its importance during the Roman Empire. This temple, dedicated to the god Mercury, was part of a larger network of Roman religious sites throughout the region. The presence of such a structure suggests that Beit Mery was a notable settlement during Roman times. The Roman rulers of Lebanon made Beit Mery their summer resort due to its high location and summer weather.

== Archaeology ==
There are two prehistoric archaeological sites in Beit Mery where flint industries have been found by Jesuit archaeologists:

1) Beit Mery I is on the right bank of the Beirut River, south southwest of the town at an altitude of approximately 125 metres (410 ft) above sea level. It was found by Jesuit Father Dillenseger who determined it to be an Acheulean site. The material was donated to the Saint Joseph University by the French Faculty of Medicine.

2) Beit Mery II is east of the road from Beit Mery to Deir el Qala'a on a sloping plateau facing the junction of the Nahr Meten and Nahr Jamani. It was found by M. Gautier who recovered Heavy Neolithic flint tools from the surface. V. Hankey also recovered some retouched blades from this area.

But what makes Beit Mery notable, including for tourism, are the scattered ruins of the Roman era, that lasted five centuries plus the two of the Byzantine era.

In Beit Mery there it is what’s left of a Roman temple that once matched the grandeur of Baalbek’s temples and Niha’s fortress. A church dedicated to St. John the Baptist, was built over the temple’s remains in the 18th century. You can still see the original stonework in the remaining columns that adorn the square at the church’s entrance. Though it suffered a great deal of damage during the Civil War, the site has since been dutifully restored and maintained for cultural and touristic events. The monastery has proved an ideal locale for concerts, competitions, art exhibitions, conferences, poetry nights, and social gatherings. In town, below the monastery, you will find smaller temples dedicated to various Roman deities, in addition to public Roman baths with their terra cotta pipes. There are also some remains of a Byzantine city that dates back to the 5th and 6th centuries.Lebanon Ministry of Tourism

The Monastery of Saint John the Baptist (Deir El Kalaa), built by Maronite monks in the 18th century, includes Roman ruins dating back to the first century AD. "The site has the remains of a Byzantine church, a Roman bathhouse, the remains of a Roman villa and a street that would have been the local market of the town, showing the remains of shops and houses".

== Tourism ==
The town has ancient Roman and Byzantine ruins as well as the historic Maronite Monastery of Saint John the Baptist, (Deir el Kalaa) which was built in 1750. The town, which is only 16 km (9.9 mi) from Beirut, continues to be a summer resort in Lebanon with a landmark hotel, the Al Bustan. Pine forests surround the town. Restaurants with views of the valleys and the sea make Beit Mery a favorite summer spot.

== Climate ==
Beit Meri has a Hot-summer mediterranean climate (Csa) with cool, wet winters and warm, dry summers.

Climate data for Beit Meri
Month	Jan	Feb	Mar	Apr	May	Jun	Jul	Aug	Sep	Oct	Nov	Dec	Year
Mean daily maximum °C (°F)	12.9 (55.2)	13.5 (56.3)	16.0 (60.8)	20.5 (68.9)	24.6 (76.3)	27.6 (81.7)	29.0 (84.2)	29.5 (85.1)	27.2 (81.0)	24.7 (76.5)	19.6 (67.3)	15.3 (59.5)	21.7 (71.1)
Daily mean °C (°F)	9.2 (48.6)	9.7 (49.5)	11.6 (52.9)	15.3 (59.5)	18.9 (66.0)	21.8 (71.2)	23.1 (73.6)	23.6 (74.5)	21.6 (70.9)	19.4 (66.9)	15.0 (59.0)	11.4 (52.5)	16.7 (62.1)
Mean daily minimum °C (°F)	5.6 (42.1)	5.9 (42.6)	7.3 (45.1)	10.2 (50.4)	13.3 (55.9)	16.1 (61.0)	17.3 (63.1)	17.7 (63.9)	16.1 (61.0)	14.2 (57.6)	10.5 (50.9)	7.5 (45.5)	11.8 (53.3)
Average precipitation mm (inches)	251 (9.9)	215 (8.5)	171 (6.7)	80 (3.1)	31 (1.2)	1 (0.0)	1 (0.0)	1 (0.0)	7 (0.3)	43 (1.7)	121 (4.8)	198 (7.8)	1,120 (44)
Source: Climate-Data.org
