= Sursock bronze =

Roman-era bronze statuette

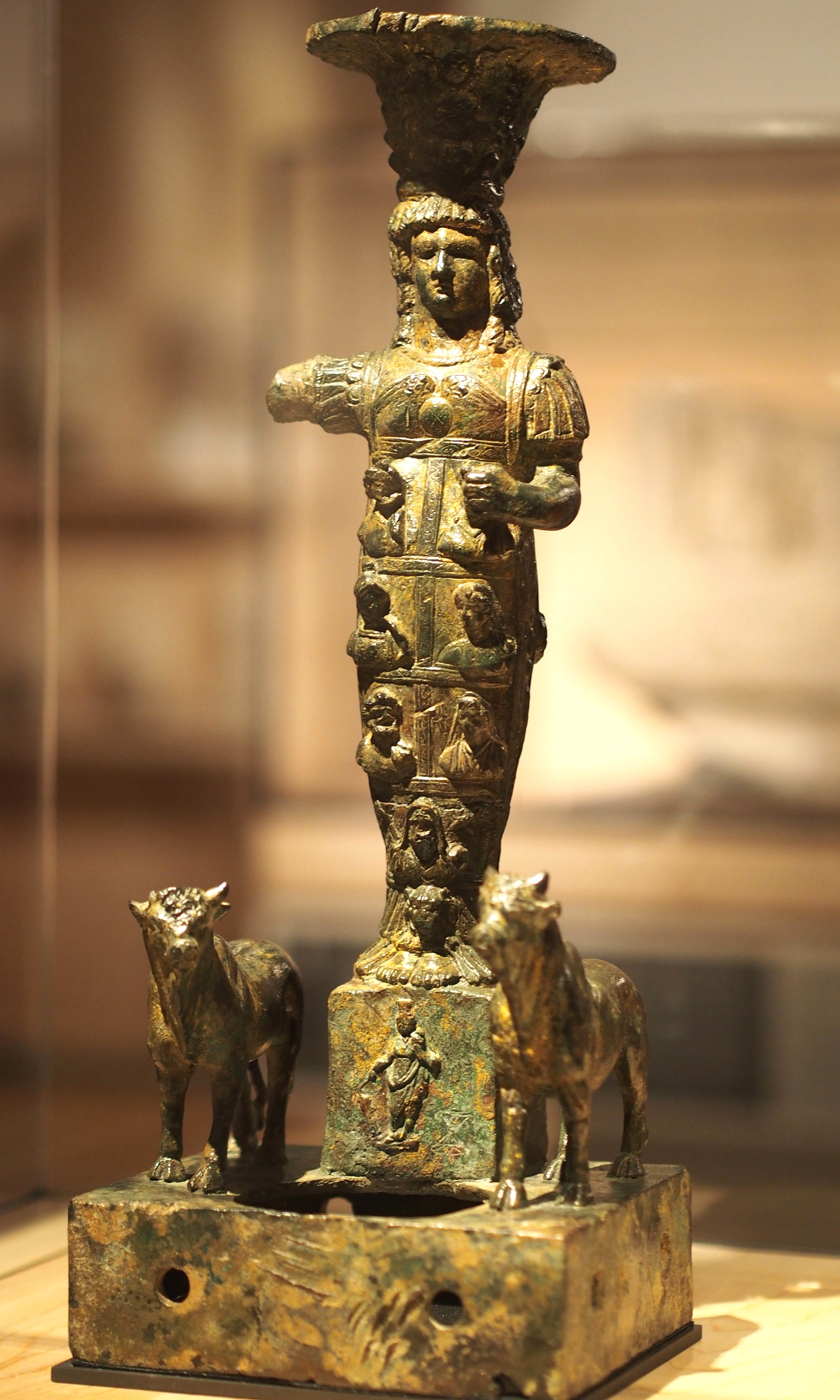
- The Sursock bronze depicts Jupiter Heliopolitanus, who is flanked by two young bulls and is missing the right arm.
- Completion date: 2nd century AD
- Catalog: AO 19534
- Medium: Gilded bronze
- Subject: Jupiter Optimus Maximus Heliopolitanus in an ependytes adorned with busts of Sol, Luna, Mars, Mercury, Jupiter, Juno, and Saturn, with Tyche on the pedestal
- Dimensions: 38.4 cm × 14.7 cm (15.1 in × 5.8 in)
- Condition: Vandalized in antiquity, missing right arm
- Location: Louvre, Paris

The Sursock bronze, also known as the Sursock statuette, is a gilt-bronze sculptural group of Jupiter Heliopolitanus (Heliopolitan Jupiter) dating to the second century AD. The work is a miniature of the cult statue of the god as it stood in the Great Temple of Baalbek, Lebanon, around the mid‑second century AD. Measuring 38.4 centimeters (15.1 in) in height, the bronze stands on a small cubic base flanked by a pair of young bulls, with the entire group resting on a larger rectangular plinth. Jupiter Heliopolitanus is a syncretic supreme deity who was venerated in the Great Temple of Baalbek, the largest sanctuary in the Roman world, renowned for its oracular activity.

The statuette shows the god as a beardless youth wearing a kalathos, a basket-shaped hat, and an ependytes, a close-fitting dress, under ornate armor. This full body covering features busts of seven deities associated with celestial bodies, arranged in rectangular registers. From top left to bottom right, these are: Sol and Luna, the deities of the Sun and the Moon, respectively; Mars and Mercury in the next row down; followed by Jupiter and his consort Juno (replacing Venus, consistent with ancient Greek and Latin sources associating Venus' celestial light with Juno); and Saturn. Four-pointed stars are depicted beside Mars, Mercury, and Saturn to signify their planetary nature, whereas Venus is accompanied by two stars symbolizing her dual aspects as the "morning" and "evening star".

The statuette also features a winged solar disc above the armor busts and a lion's head above Jupiter's bare feet. On the front of the small pedestal stands Tyche holding a cornucopia, and stylized thunderbolt motifs adorn the sides of the armor. The Sursock bronze illustrates the syncretism and fusion of Canaanite, Greek, and Roman elements, showing how Jupiter Heliopolitanus evolved from the Canaanite Baal-Hadad into a cosmic deity associated with planetary order and prophecy.

The piece is named after Charles Sursock, its former owner. Originally gilded, it has lost much of its gold to wear. The bronze was likely damaged in antiquity, perhaps by Christian iconoclasts; it was later restored and is now the centerpiece of the Louvre's Roman Levant collection in Paris. In 1920, René Dussaud, Deputy Curator of the Department of Oriental Antiquities, selected it to inaugurate the first issue of Syria, the leading French journal of Levantine archaeology.

== Historical background and discovery ==
Relevant historical periods
Ancient Near East (Northern Levant)
- Persian period: 538–333/2 BC
- Hellenistic period: 332–64 BC
- Roman period: 63 BC – 337 AD (Note: Levantine chronologies begin the Roman period in 64 BC with Pompey's annexation of the area, whereas the British classical historian Fergus Millar adopts 32 BC to avoid the complexities of the late Roman Republic and to frame the Near East from the battle of Actium onward; he ends in 337 AD because Emperor Constantine I's death marks the onset of major religious and institutional transformations that redefine the region.)

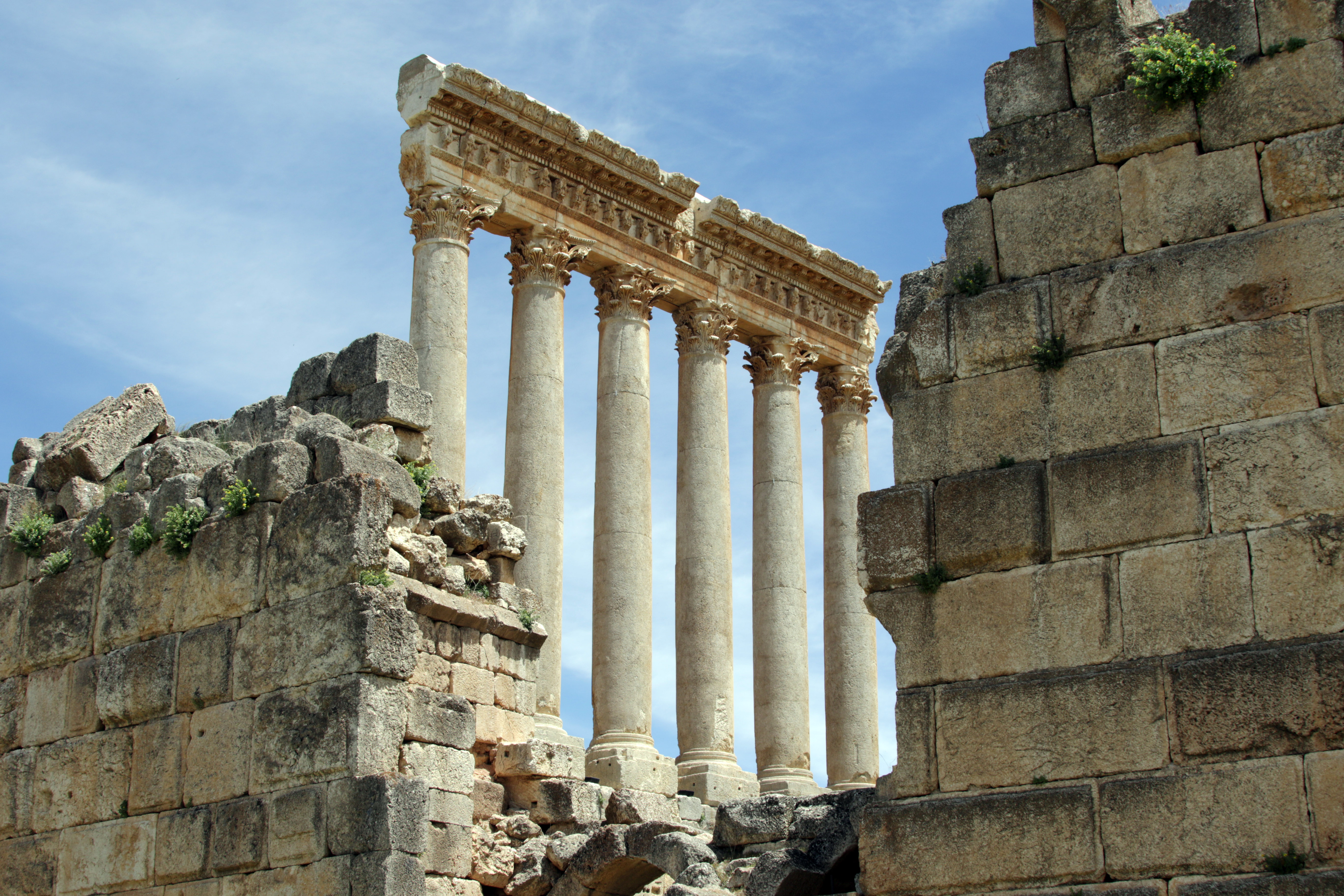
Remains of the Great Temple of Baalbek

=== Cult of Jupiter Heliopolitanus ===
Jupiter Heliopolitanus (or Heliopolitan Jupiter) was the syncretic supreme deity worshipped in the Great Temple of Baalbek, located in modern‑day Lebanon. In Latin sources he appears as Jupiter Optimus Maximus Heliopolitanus (dative case: Iovi Optimo Maximo Heliopolitano), often abbreviated as IOMH. His cult evolved from the Canaanite religion, specifically from the worship of Baal-Hadad, an ancient storm and fertility god worshiped in various regions of the Levant, including Canaan and Syria. (Note: Andreas Kropp offers a counterargument, denying a pre-Roman root or character of the Heliopolitan gods, including Jupiter. In his 2009 paper, he examines the role of the Ituraean tetrarchs of Chalcis as high priests in the development of Heliopolis and its cults, and proposes that the creation of the supreme god Jupiter Optimus Maximus Heliopolitanus followed the political and cultural disruption created by the establishment of Roman military colonies in Berytus and Heliopolis by Augustus in 15 BC.) Baal, meaning 'lord', 'owner', or 'master', was a title applied to various Levantine deities; it is attested as a divine name in third-millennium BC texts, with the earliest known reference appearing in a deity list from Abu Salabikh, an archaeological site in Iraq. Hadad was known in particular as the god of rain, thunder, and storms, associated with agricultural fertility, and was often depicted holding a whip and thunderbolt. Modern scholarship largely identifies Baal with Hadad, suggesting the name Baal was adopted as a reverent alias when Hadad's cult grew in importance, rendering his true name too sacred to be spoken aloud by anyone except the high priest. This practice was paralleled in other cultures where substitute titles were used for deities whose names were considered too holy, such as "Bel" for Marduk among the Babylonians and "Adonai" for Yahweh among the Israelites. Some scholars, however, propose an alternative reconstruction, (Note: In his 1957 definition of "Baal" in Die Religion in Geschichte und Gegenwart, Otto Eissfeldt observes that many Old Testament passages, as well as extra-biblical sources such as the Amarna letters and Ugaritic texts, show that the deity referred to as Baal was frequently identified with the storm and weather god Hadad. In Le Antiche divinità semitiche, Mitchell Dahood suggests that Baal and Hadad are essentially the same deity, with Baal being the West Semitic name and Hadad the East Semitic name; an identification is supported by linguistic and textual evidence, including parallels in Ugaritic and Akkadian sources. John Day further clarifies that, although it was sometimes thought that "the Baals" referred to distinct local Canaanite deities, the Ugaritic texts show that Baal ('the Lord') was an epithet, later a personal name, of Hadad, meaning that the various local Baals were in fact manifestations of this single god.) arguing that Baal was an indigenous Canaanite deity whose cult was identified with or absorbed aspects of Hadad's. Despite this, by the first millennium BC, Hadad and Baal were regarded as distinct deities: Hadad was primarily venerated by the Aramaeans, while Baal was venerated by the Phoenicians and other Canaanites.

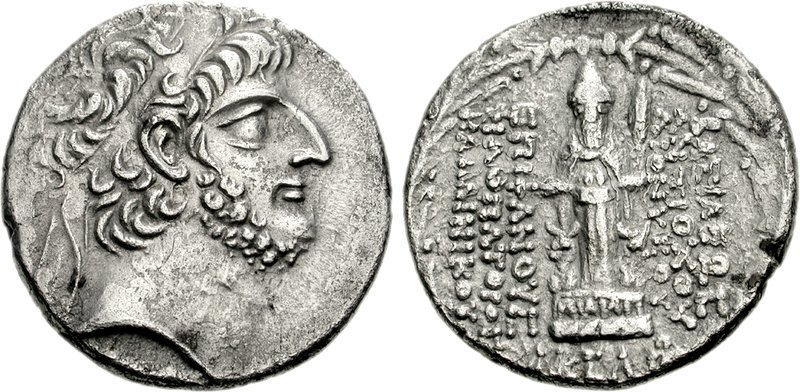
Tetradrachm struck at Damascus (83/2 BC), featuring on the reverse Hadad, depicted standing on a double base, holding a wheat stalk and flanked by bulls

During the Hellenistic period (c. 332 – c. 64 BC), (Note: After the death of Alexander the Great in 323 BC, the Diadochi (his generals, family members, and companions) divided and ruled various parts of his empire; this era became known as the Hellenistic period, marked by the spread of Greek culture and influence across the territories they controlled. Control of the Levant, a strategically significant region, was contested among the successors. The Seleucid Empire, led by Seleucus I Nicator, and the Ptolemaic Kingdom of Egypt, under Ptolemy I Soter, were primary rivals in this struggle. Following the pivotal Battle of Ipsus in 301 BCE, much of the Levant came under Seleucid rule. An early sanctuary existed in Baalbek well before the Macedonian conquest. During the Hellenistic period, it was placed under the authority of the tetrarchs of Chalcis ad Libanum, who also held the title of "high priest".) the cult of Baal-Hadad in Baalbek acquired a solar character. (Note: University of Nottingham scholar Andreas Kropp challenges the established notions of a solar syncretism of Jupiter Heliopolitanus, and his identification with the Semitic Hadad. He suggests that before the Hellenistic era, a local deity influenced the image of Heliopolitan Jupiter, but he does not specify the name of this deity.) The Hellenistic overlords likely identified Baal-Hadad with their sun god Helios. Baal, a storm god often depicted brandishing a whip symbolizing lightning, shared this attribute with Helios, who wielded a whip to drive his sun chariot across the sky. The Hellenistic rulers renamed the town Heliopolis, a change likely resulting from the conflation of the two deities. The name Heliopolis is often interpreted as evidence for the worship of a solar deity, a practice that likely emerged during the Ptolemaic administration of the region in the third century BC. The name, shared with the famous Egyptian city, was used by the priests of the Egyptian Heliopolis to misattribute the origins of the cult of Baalbek to their own traditions, as recounted by the Roman historian Macrobius in his early fifth-century AD work Saturnalia, who added to the myth by reporting that the cult statue of Jupiter Heliopolitanus in Baalbek originally came from Egypt. The French archaeologist Henri Seyrig and the Syrian priest and scholar Joseph Hajjar refuted the claim of the Egyptian origin of the cult, and of the statue of Jupiter Heliopolitanus. Seyrig recognizing it as part of the syncretic tendencies of Macrobius, and Hajjar further attributed the mistake to Macrobius's conflation of the Baalbek storm-god with the solar deity Helios.

Hadad was commonly identified with Zeus in the Hellenistic and Roman periods, particularly in his aspect as Zeus Keraunios (Zeus of the Thunderbolt). Contemporary iconography in Baalbek shows Jupiter Heliopolitanus as a solarized form of Hadad. Following the annexation of the region by Rome in 63 BC, (Note: In 15 BCE, Heliopolis was adjoined to the territory of "Colonia Iulia Augusta Felix Berytus", and was no longer under the authority of the indigenous Iturean princes of Chalcis. It maintained however good relations with the princes, who held control over southern access for pilgrims coming from Palestine, Arabia, or Damascus.) the cult of Hadad found its way to Rome, where he was mentioned in three inscriptions on an altar uncovered on the eastern slopes of the Janiculum Hill, reading "to the god Adados", "to the god Adados of Libanos", and "to the god Adados of the Mountaintop". The cult of Hadad eventually syncretized with the Roman chief god Jupiter, evolving into a cosmic and universal deity. In the second century AD, the Romans built a monumental temple complex in Baalbek, dedicated to Jupiter Heliopolitanus. The Temple of Jupiter Heliopolitanus in Baalbek was renowned in antiquity for its oracular functions and as a divination center; it is the largest Roman temple ever constructed, with columns 20 meters tall and a podium built from massive stone blocks, some weighing up to 800 tonnes (130,000 st). Macrobius records that during oracle sessions, the god's statue was carried in a litter by the bearers who, guided by divine will, moved in certain directions, which priests interpreted to deliver oracles. The cult of Jupiter Heliopolitanus spread from this cultic center to the far corners of the Roman Empire, with inscriptions mentioning the god found in Athens, Rome, Puteoli, Carnuntum, Aquincum, Massilia and Nemausus in Gaul, at forts in Germania Superior and Pannonia, and even as far as Magna in Britain. The ritual practices (Note: These include rites of divination and the oracular power of Jupiter, the dedication of hair to Venus Heliopolitana and the associated sacred prostitution, the prominence of astrology, ritual processions to the nearby 'Aïn el-Gouë spring with the deposition of divine images in the sacred spring's basins, liturgical banquets, ritual ablutions and hair shaving, the prohibition of pork, and the celebration of the Maiuma festival.) and cultic installations of the Temple of Jupiter Heliopolitanus in Baalbek (Note: The architectural layout of the grand sanctuary—with its two towers flanking the entrance to the temple complex, successive courtyards, isolated columns in the great court, elongated basins for ritual ablutions, and a monumental multi-story altar adjacent to a smaller communion sacrifice altar in the courtyard of the Great Temple.) still exhibited, even in Roman times, significant Semitic influences.

=== Identification and descriptions of the Jupiter Heliopolitanus iconographic type ===
The French Assyriologist and archaeologist François Lenormant first described the Heliopolitan representation of Jupiter in 1876, based on a relief on an altar discovered in 1752 in the basin of a Roman-era fountain in Nîmes (see images below). A significant number of representations of the Heliopolitan Jupiter iconographic type have been identified, including bronzes, statuettes, stone or marble reliefs, and coins from various cities of the Levant, including Orthosia in Phoenicia, Caesarea ad Libanum, Ptolemais in Phoenicia, Neapolis, Eleutheropolis, Diospolis, Nikopolis in Palestine, and Dium.

Within this iconographic type, Jupiter Heliopolitanus is consistently shown as a standing, youthful, beardless deity with voluminous corkscrew locks, while variation occurs primarily in costume and headgear. He is most commonly depicted wearing a kalathos (a basket-shaped headdress that tapers at the base), together with an ependytes (a close-fitting dress) and armor adorned with rosettes and busts of divinities. In some of the bronze statuettes, the kalathos is replaced by a pschent, the ancient Egyptian double crown, while on several miniature engravings, the kalathos is supplemented or replaced by a radiate crown. The iconography is corroborated by the fifth-century AD report of Macrobius who, citing third-century Phoenician philosopher Porphyry, described the cult statue of Jupiter Heliopolitanus as youthful and beardless, with layered, cascading locks of hair, brandishing a thunderbolt and ears of wheat in his raised left hand. This description is generally accurate, except regarding the attribute in the god's left hand, where Macrobius adds the thunderbolt to the ears of wheat. No known representations depict these two attributes associated in this manner, with both held together in the same hand.

Altar of Jupiter Heliopolitanus and Nemausus (CIL XII 3072), Nîmes

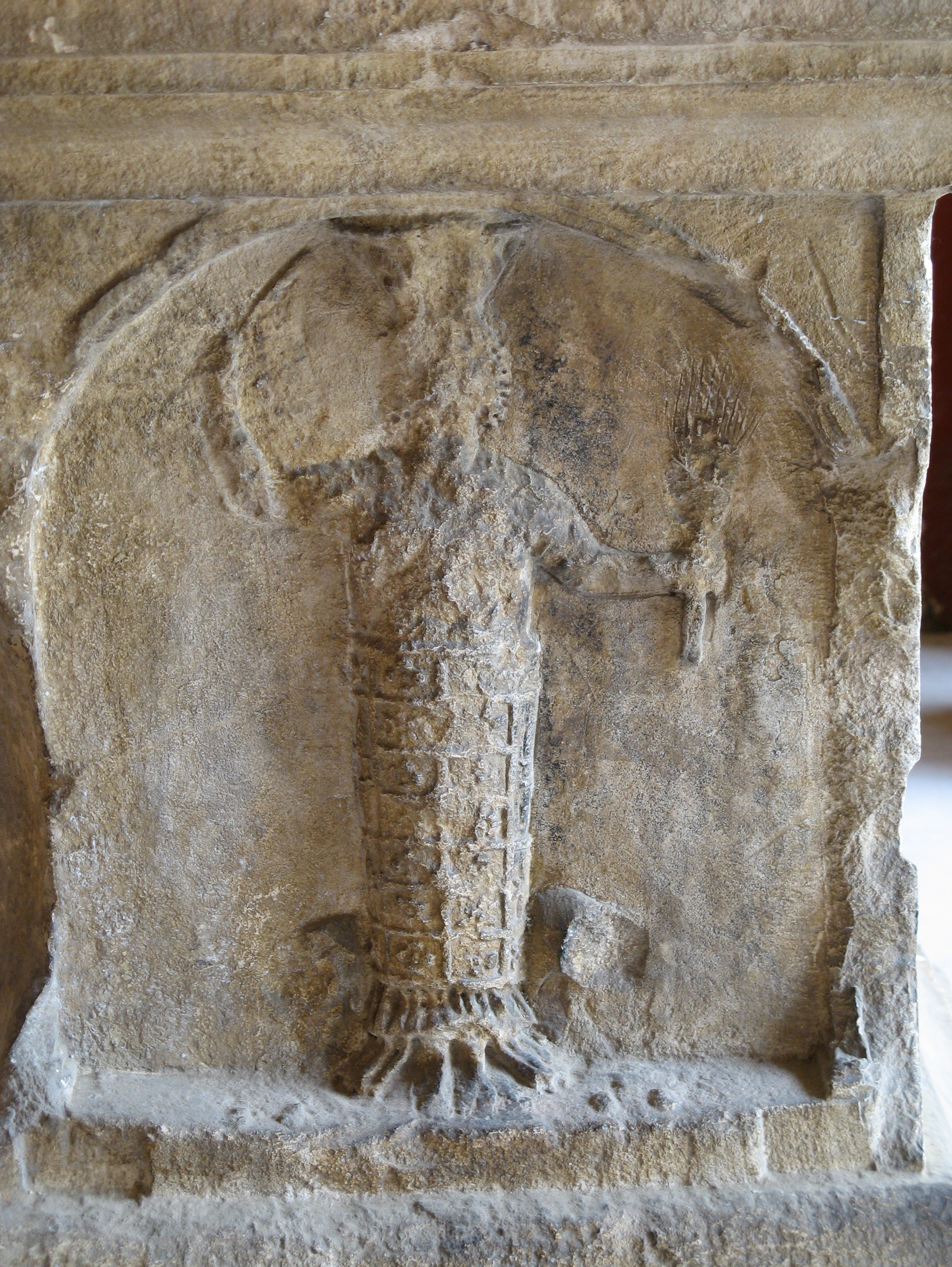
Left side

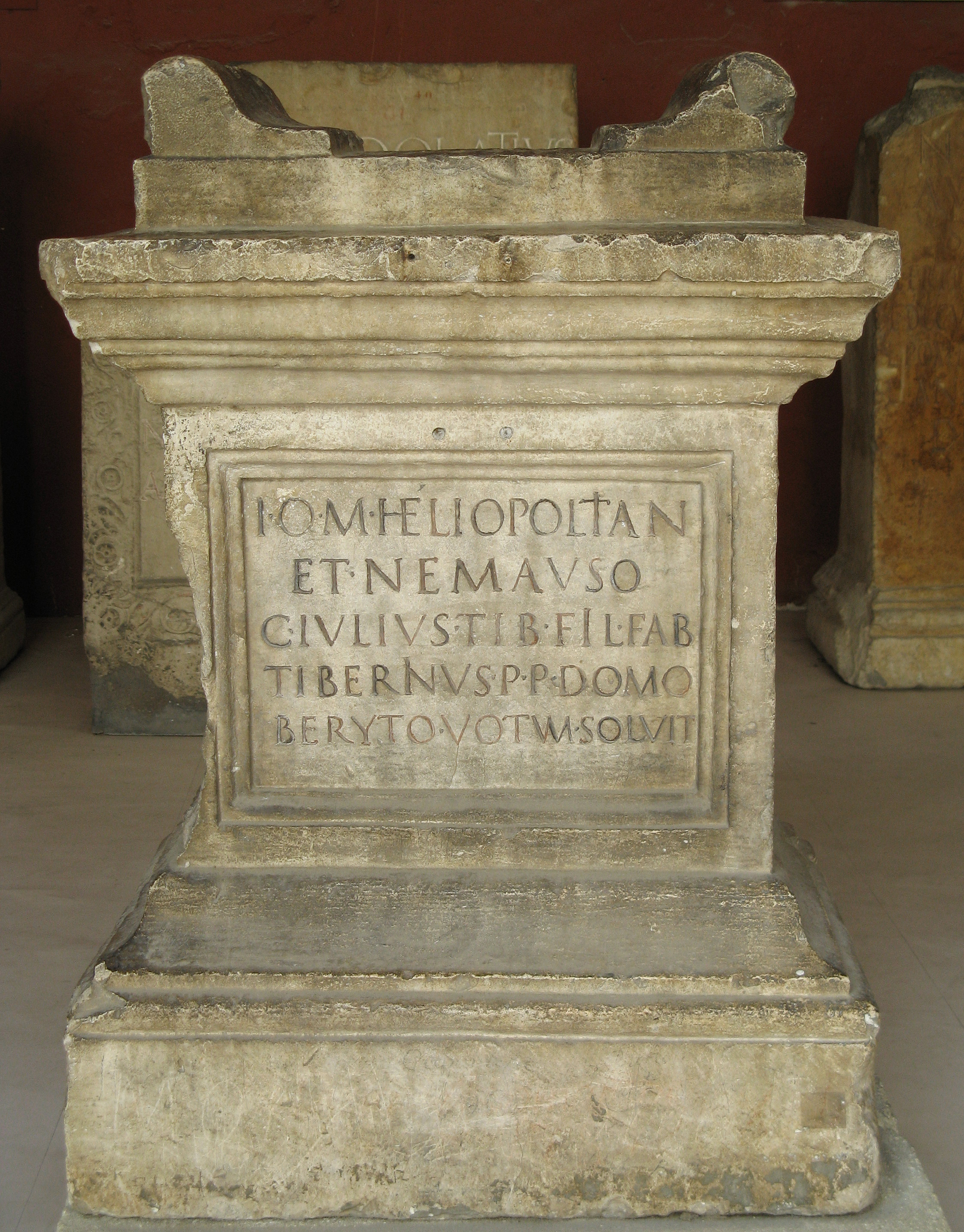
Front side

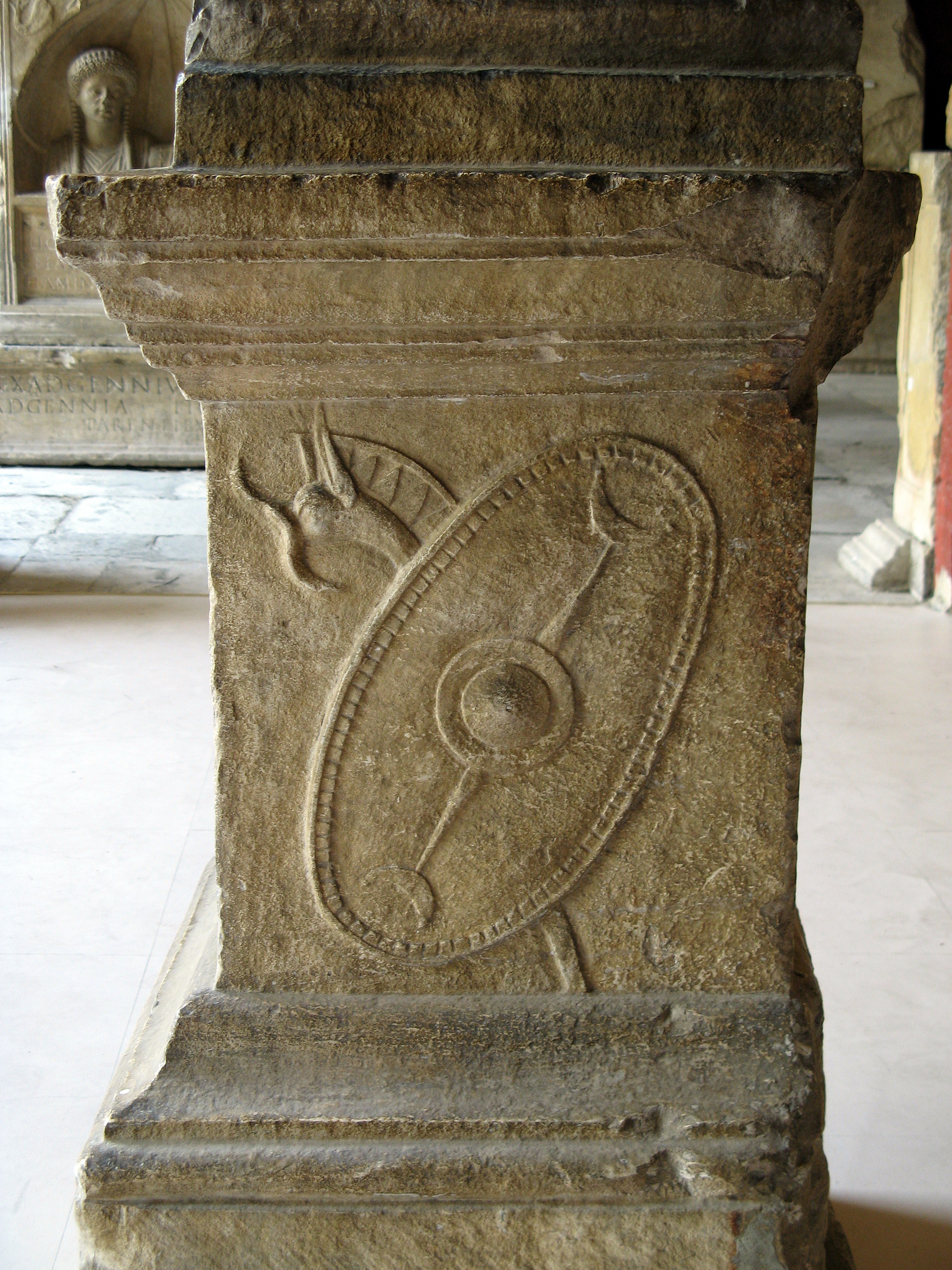
Right side

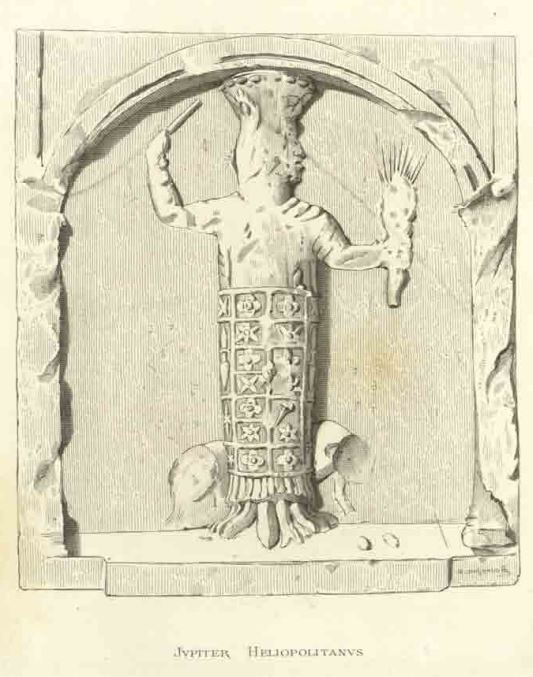
1876 engraving of left side

White marble altar dedicated to Jupiter Heliopolitanus and Nemausus by Caius Julius Tiberinus, primipile centurion; discovered in 1752 in the fountain basin at Nîmes, France
Left: Jupiter Heliopolitanus standing. Engraving from Gazette archéologique (1876)

=== Discovery ===
The Sursock bronze's findspot remains a subject of debate. The Jesuit scholar Sébastien Ronzevalle first discussed the statuette in a 1913 study, in which he stated only that it had been found "in Lebanon", without specifying a precise provenance. The archaeologist René Dussaud, then Deputy Curator of the Louvre's Department of Near Eastern Antiquities, identified Baalbek as the discovery site in his 1920 monograph Jupiter héliopolitain - Bronze de la collection Charles Sursock. (Note: The available published literature does not record a discovery date for the Sursock bronze.) The bronze is named after the Beiruti aristocrat Charles Sursock who acquired it from the antiquarian Jamil Baroudy. Baroudy may have cited Baalbek as the findspot to enhance the statuette's appeal and increase its market value. Another contemporary Lebanese antiquarian, Élie Bustros, suggested an alternative site near Choueifat, a location considered credible by historian Joseph Hajjar because two inscriptions mentioning the god Jupiter Heliopolitanus were found there.

The top part of the statuette, including the idol's body, was discovered before the lower part with the base and bulls. The right arm, however, was never located. The group was found hacked and disjointed, with the kalathos headdress separated from the head, the head detached from the body, and the small cubic pedestal separated from the underlying larger base. The bulls and the nose of the idol were particularly affected by axe blows, indicating deliberate acts of vandalism in antiquity. The bronze was acquired by the Louvre in 1939.

== Composition and description ==
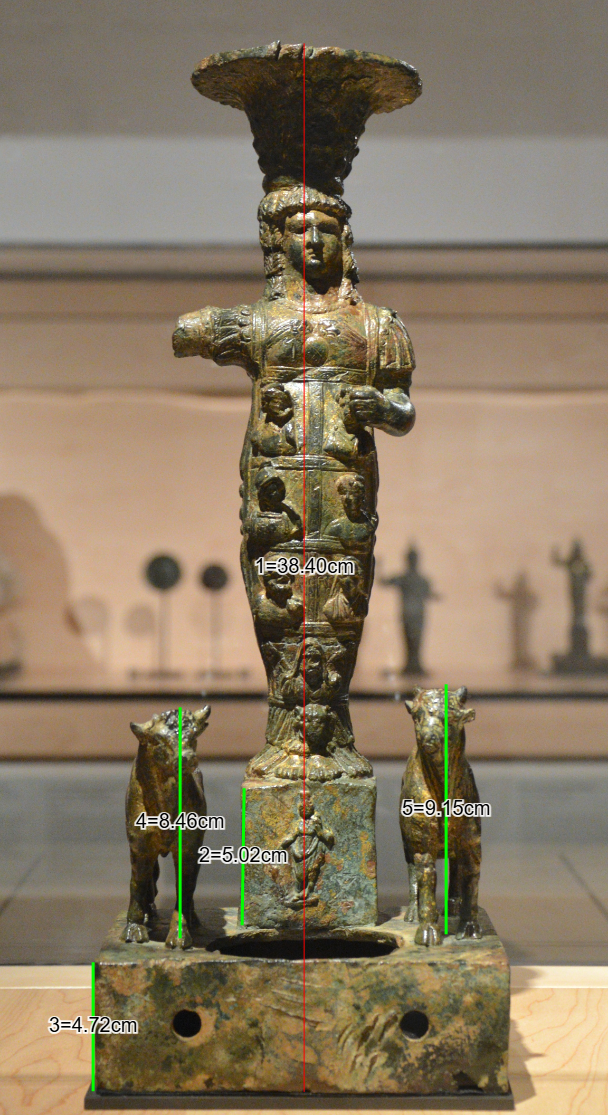
View of the Sursock bronze statuette group with superimposed measurement reference lines

The statuette measures 38.4 cm (15.1 in) in overall height; the god is depicted standing on a square base with sides measuring 5 cm (2.0 in). Two bulls flank the effigy of the god, with the entire group resting on a rectangular base measuring 14.7 cm (5.8 in) wide, 12.7 cm (5.0 in) deep, and 4.7 cm (1.9 in) high. The entire statuette was originally coated in gold, and although much of it has worn away, visible traces of it remain. The god is depicted as youthful, beardless, and with a full face; these attributes reflect an ancient local iconographic type (Note: An "iconographic type" denotes a conventionalized mode of representation defined by recurring attributes, poses, and visual features associated with a particular deity or cult.) of the god Hadad devoid of classical influence. The eye grooves were once inlaid with enamel or precious stone according to Syro-Phoenician practice. A powerful blow to the face slightly curved the tip of the nose downwards. The neck is thick, with a prominent Adam's apple, and the hair falls onto the shoulders in four layers of curly locks, completely covering the ears.

The statuette's head is crowned by a kalathos. The body of the kalathos is decorated with four ears of wheat and an interlocking pattern of foliage or intertwined reeds that compose the basket. The top of the front of the kalathos features a sun disk framed by two uraei (representations of a sacred snake used as a symbol of sovereignty and divinity in ancient Egypt). The figure is shown wearing a short-sleeved ependytes, covered by an armor bearing scrollwork bands that delimit compartments with figured decorations. The front and back of the deity's armor are divided into square registers, with one to two registers per row. The front registers contain miniature busts of seven deities associated with celestial bodies, while the back registers house cultic animals and symbols. On the front, from the top, a single register features a winged disk, followed in the next row by two square registers with the busts of Sol, the radiant Sun, and Luna, the crescent Moon. (Note: Dussaud identifies these figures using the Greek theonyms Helios and Selene rather than their Roman equivalents, Sol and Luna.) Sol is depicted holding a whip in his right hand. The third row also includes two registers featuring Mars wearing military cuirass with imbricated scales and a legionary's shoulder piece, alongside Mercury with a caduceus and a winged helmet. (Note: Dussaud wrongly identified these deities with Athena and Hermes.) The fourth row features the busts of a bearded and draped Jupiter, and his consort Juno, veiled and wearing a diadem. Underneath the duo, in a single compartment, is a bust of a bearded and veiled Saturn. These busts represent the Sun, the Moon, and the planets, with Juno replacing Venus, consistent with ancient Greek and Latin sources associating Venus' celestial light with Juno. The planetary nature of these deities is emphasized by four-pointed star symbols placed next to Mars, Mercury, and Saturn, while Venus notably has two stars, one on each side of the bust, representing the dual aspect as both morning and evening star, Phosphorus and Hesperus respectively. The bottom register of the front of the dress features a lion's head positioned above the statuette's bare feet. The reverse of the tunic is divided into ten registers, featuring, from top to bottom, a winged solar disk with uraei, an eagle with outstretched wings, two ram heads facing each other, two four-pointed stars, and four rosettes. The sides of the dress consist of a vertical field stretching from under each of the statuette's armpits to its feet. These fields each feature a stylized thunderbolt. The front face of the small base supporting the figure of Jupiter is adorned with the image of Tyche of Heliopolis, the tutelary goddess of the city, wearing a mural crown and holding a cornucopia.

Two young bulls flank the small base. According to Dussaud, the proportions of the Sursock bronze bulls confirm that they are young, further evidenced by their underdeveloped horns. This observation is corroborated by the relief in the Calvet Museum, which elucidates that in the parallel Israelite cult of the golden calf, the Hebrew term used is ʿgel, meaning 'young bull'. In the Levant, the bull/calf was the animal associated with Baal-Hadad. The group's large base is composed of a horizontal top plate and four side panels, forming a hollow, bottomless structure. Each side panel has two circular holes, about 1 cm (0.39 in) in diameter, aligned in pairs across the opposite sides. Additionally, the top plate of the base has a circular opening, about 7.3 cm (2.9 in) in diameter, which likely corresponded to a hollow space below. The edge of the opening shows no signs of wear or fitting, which suggests it was not used to hold an object like a ceremonial cup or incense burner. The arrangement of the group in two tiers is corroborated by several replicas, including a relief in the Calvet Museum.

Close-up views of the Sursock bronze

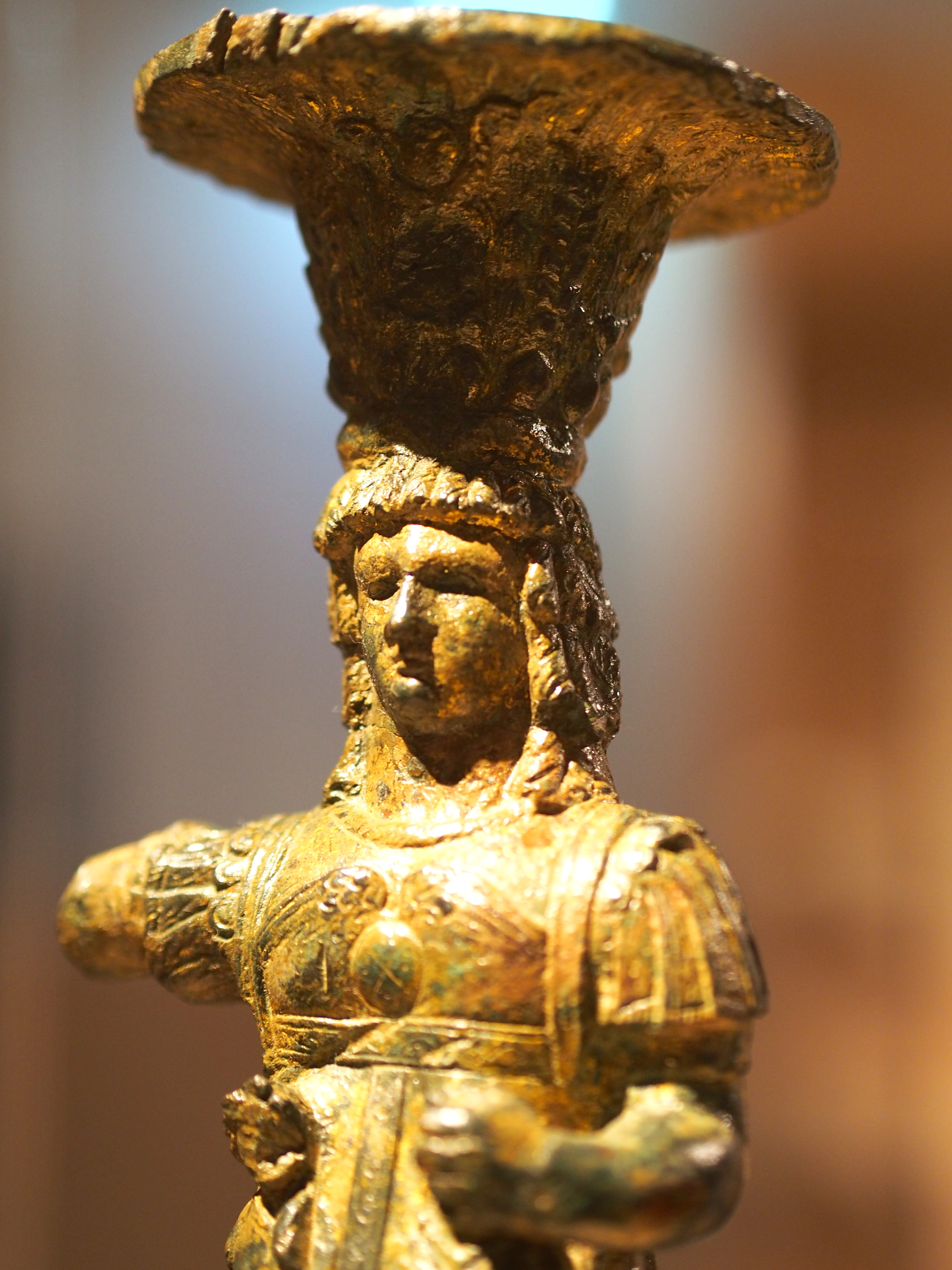
Close‑up of the Sursock bronze, showing the distinctive kalathos headdress

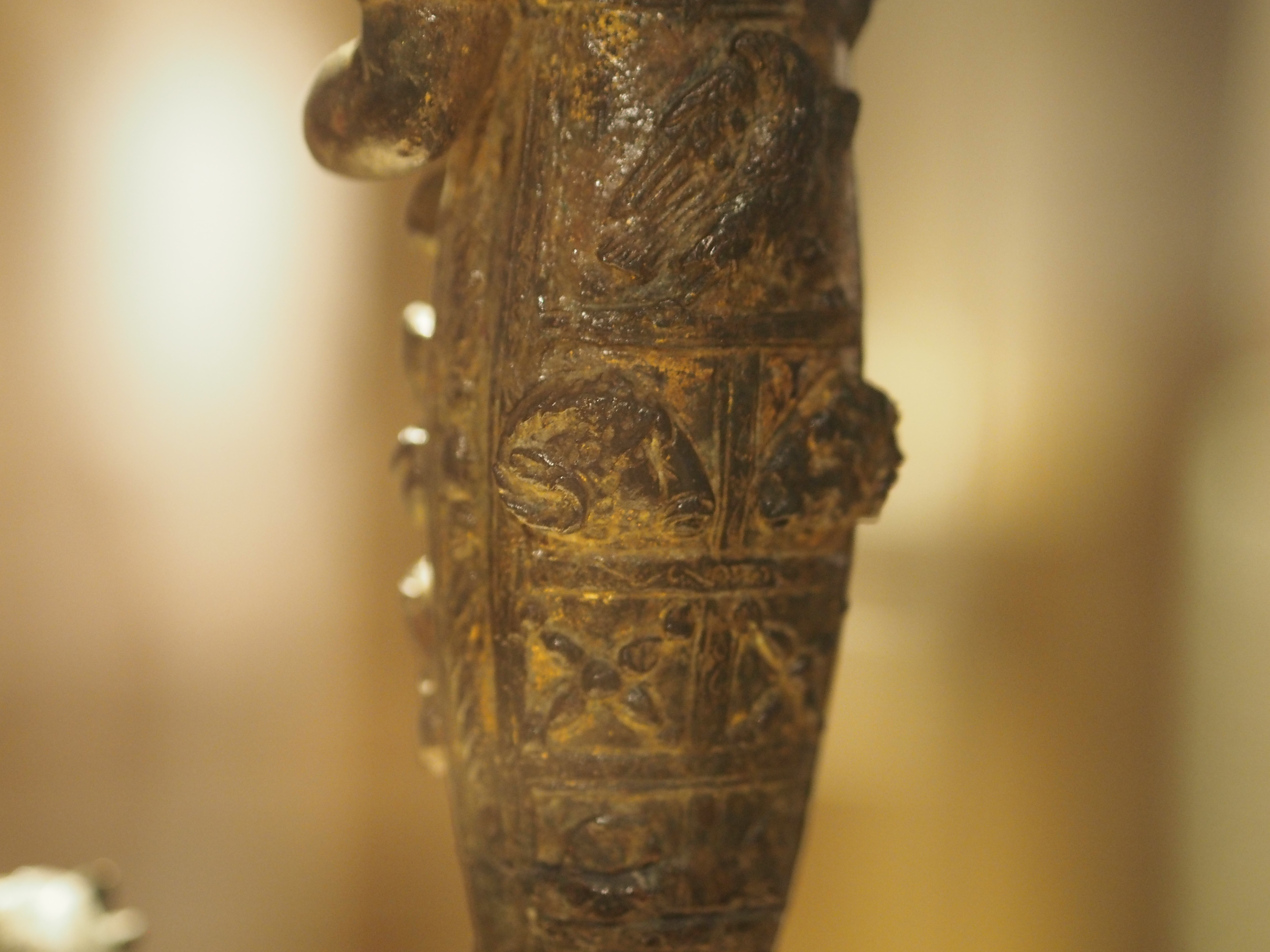
Close‑up of the reverse side of the statuette

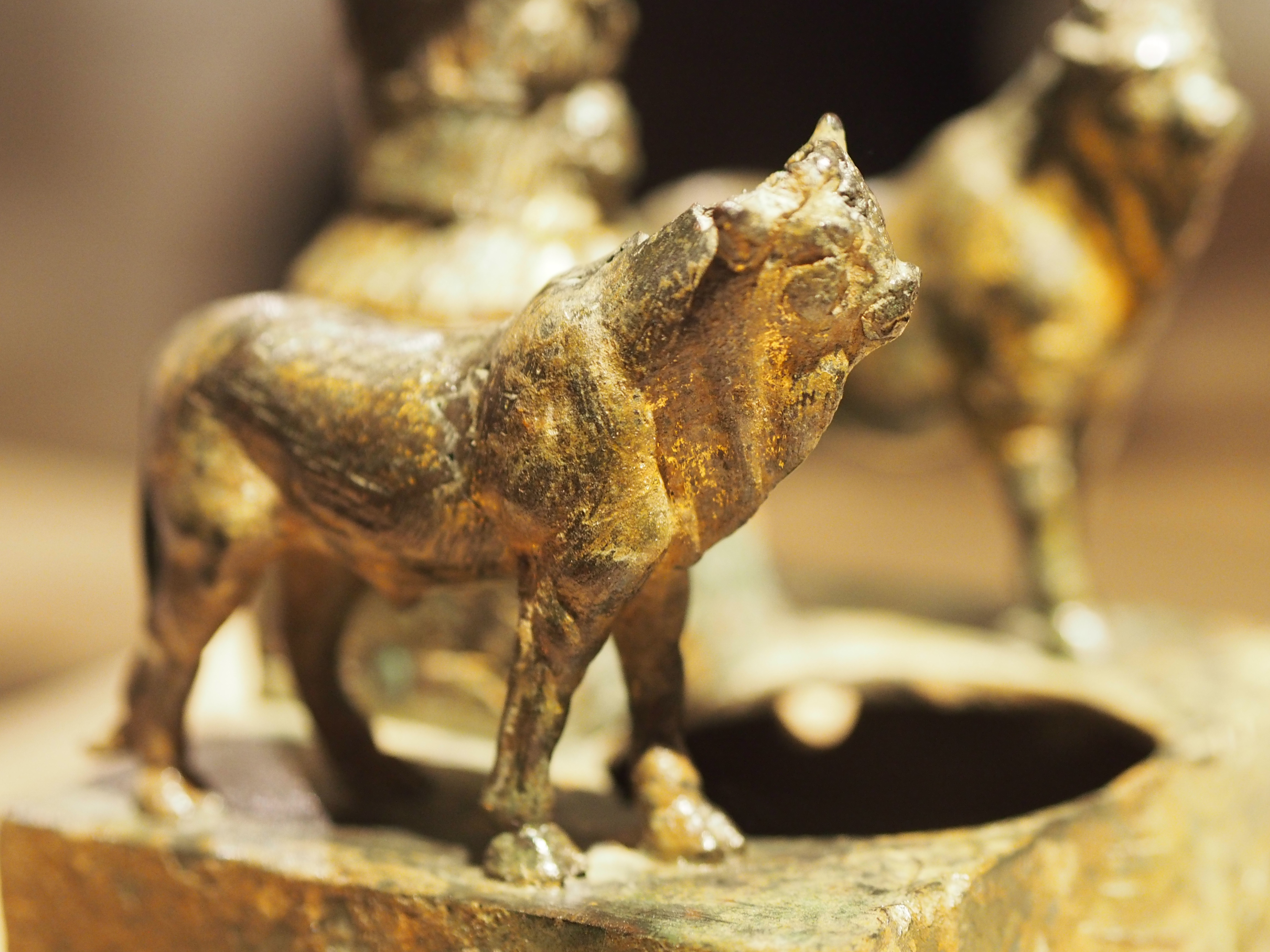
Close‑up highlighting the bulls at the base of the statuette

== Dating ==
The statuette is dated to the second century AD. Dussaud propounded that the Sursock bronze is a miniature of the cult image of Jupiter Heliopolitanus as he was venerated in the Great Temple of Baalbek in the mid-second century AD, a conclusion echoed in later publications. He also posited that the vandalism to which the statuette was subjected implies that the idol was damaged by early Christian iconoclasts.

== Interpretation ==
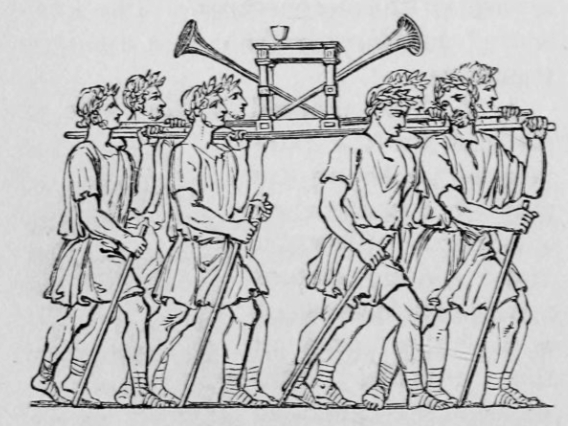
Illustration of a ferculum used by Roman soldiers to carry spoils: detail of a bas-relief from the Arch of Titus

Dussaud proposed that the Sursock bronze was not merely a votive statuette, but may instead have been used in oracular ceremonies, possibly in connection with the divinatory practices described by Macrobius. He drew attention to the statuette's prominent Adam's apple, and noted how other replicas emphasize this anatomic feature. He linked its exaggerated representation to the deity's oracular abilities. (Note: Semitic traditions identified the throat as the principal organ of speech, a notion explicitly reflected in biblical texts.) He presented two interpretations of the circular opening in the Sursock bronze's base: one suggests that the opening was used for depositing votive offerings, a practice attested in ancient Near Eastern and Judaic traditions (Genesis 35:4; Exodus 32:2; Judges 8:24–27), and the other suggests it facilitated the transmission of oracular messages. The oracle of Heliopolis was renowned, with records indicating that devotees submitted written questions, to which the god responded through the priests. A well-documented example is the consultation of the Roman emperor Trajan, who tested the oracle by sending sealed blank tablets; the response, a vine branch cut into pieces, was later interpreted as a prophecy of his death. The Sursock bronze would have been positioned, according to Dussaud, above an opening in a temple platform and may have served as a conduit for such responses. Hajjar offered an alternative hypothesis, referencing ancient texts that describe the simulacrum (cult statue) of Jupiter Heliopolitanus being carried on a ferculum (ceremonial litter) during processions before delivering oracles. He posited that the two holes on each of the base's sides could have been used for transporting the idol during processions and religious ceremonies.

=== Iconographical precedents ===
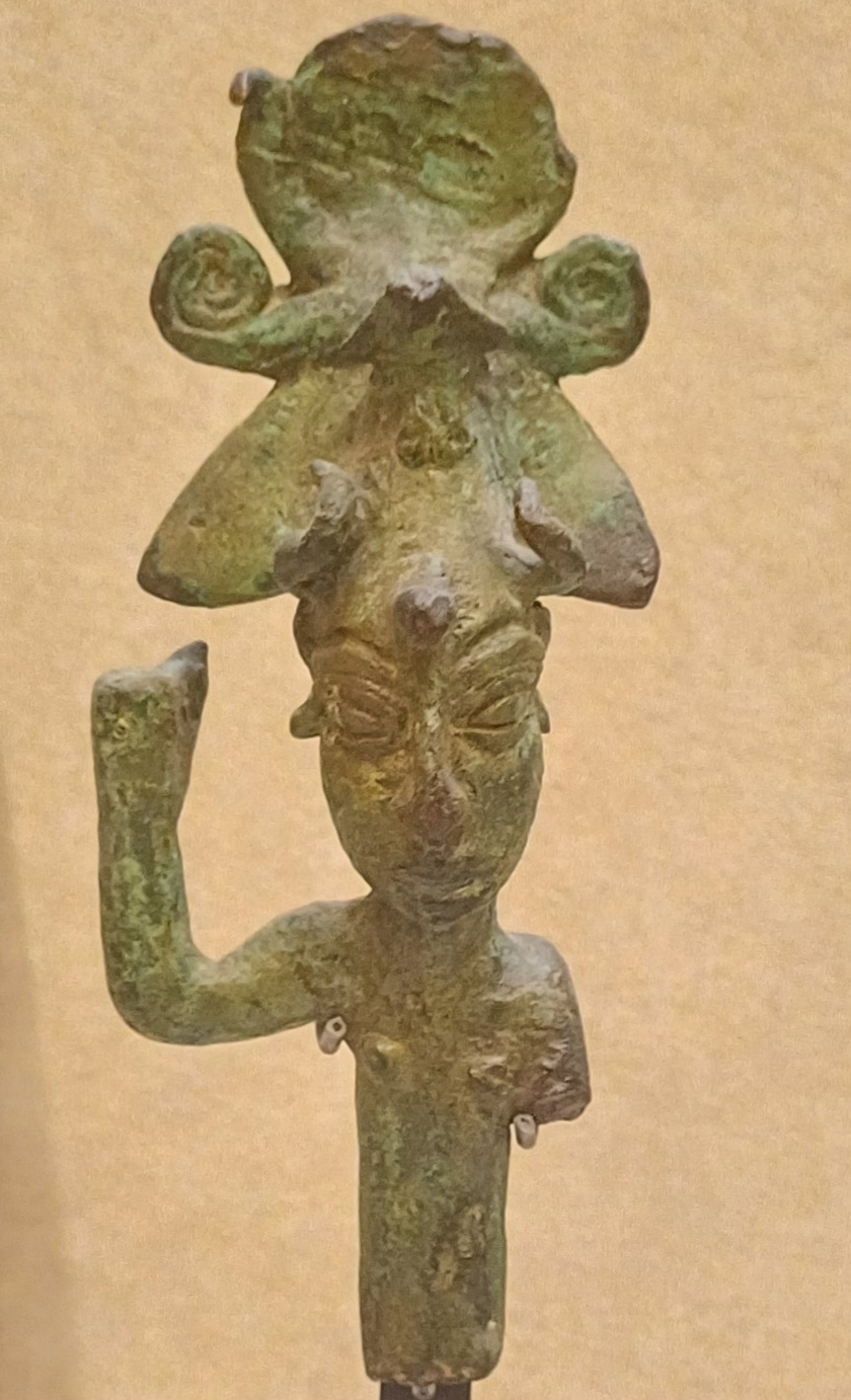
Bronze figure of a Canaanite god with composite headdress, dated to the eighth–seventh century BC, cited by René Dussaud (1920) for its iconographic parallels to the Sursock bronze

Dussaud commented that although some iconographic features, such as the grouped divine busts on the deity's dress, reflect artistic trends from the second century AD, others align with earlier depictions of Baal-Hadad. The statuette's posture, with one arm extended and the other raised in a threatening gesture, recalls the combative stance of ancient storm-gods depicted from the second to first millennia BCE, while the bull that frequently accompanies such figures remained a traditional emblem of Baal-Hadad, lord of storm and fertility. This whip appears to have replaced Baal-Hadad's conventional weapon, the thunderbolt, after his identification with the solar deity Helios, thereby symbolizing his daily celestial journey across the sky.

Dussaud noted a similarity to a bronze dated to the eighth–seventh century BC, now in the Louvre (pictured), which features a columnar body, a beardless head, and an elaborate headdress incorporating an uraeus, bull horns, a solar disk, ostrich feathers, and an eagle. Dussaud remarked that the presence of the eagle is of particular interest, as no document before Alexander the Great's conquest (c. 332 BC) associated this animal with Baal-Hadad. It was previously thought that this connection arose under Greek influence, when Baal-Hadad was identified with Zeus, whose emblem is the eagle. He noted that the Louvre bronze dated to the eighth–seventh century BC suggests that the eagle's association with the god is older, potentially dating back to the Persian period (c. 538–332 BC).

=== Iconographical variability ===
Writing in 2010, the University of Nottingham scholar Andreas Kropp examined the decorative variability of the garments on representations of Jupiter Heliopolitanus, exemplified by the Sursock bronze. Although preserved depictions share similar attributes, usually featuring Sol and Luna in the top register, no two examples display the same arrangement of details or number of registers. The front panel often includes deities associated with the seven planets or various motifs such as rosettes, discs, and mythical creatures, while the back side tends to be simpler, sometimes featuring repeated symbols like ram's heads or the winged sun-disc, with the remaining fields usually filled with rosettes. This structured yet highly individualized iconography contrasts with the more standardized cult images of figures such as Ephesian Artemis or Aphrodite of Aphrodisias during the Roman imperial period. The variability of the iconography of Jupiter Heliopolitanus may stem from limited access to the cult statue in its temple's adyton (restricted inner sanctuary) and few opportunities to observe it closely outside occasional processions.

Comparative iconographic depictions of Jupiter Heliopolitanus

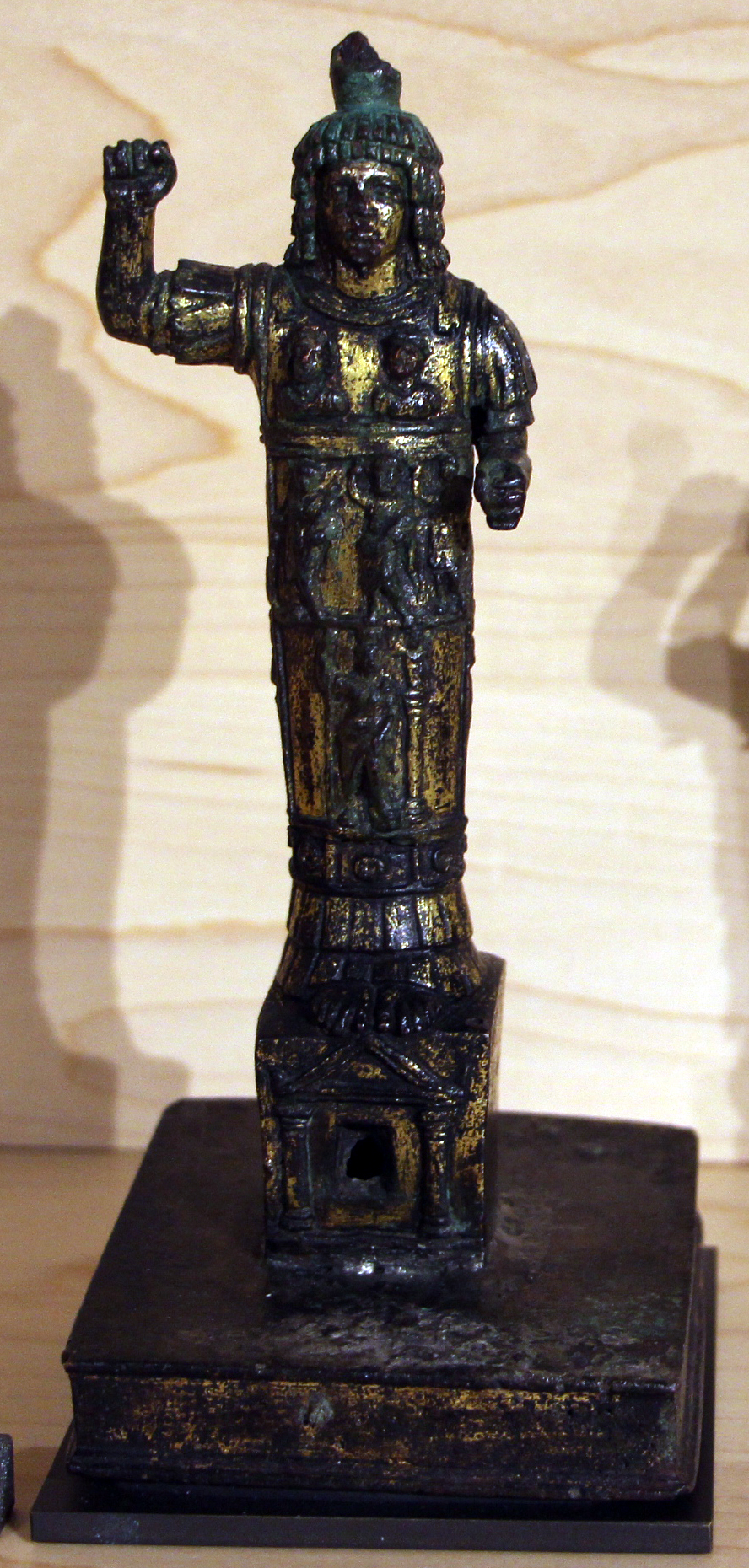
Bronze from the area of Beirut, at the Louvre

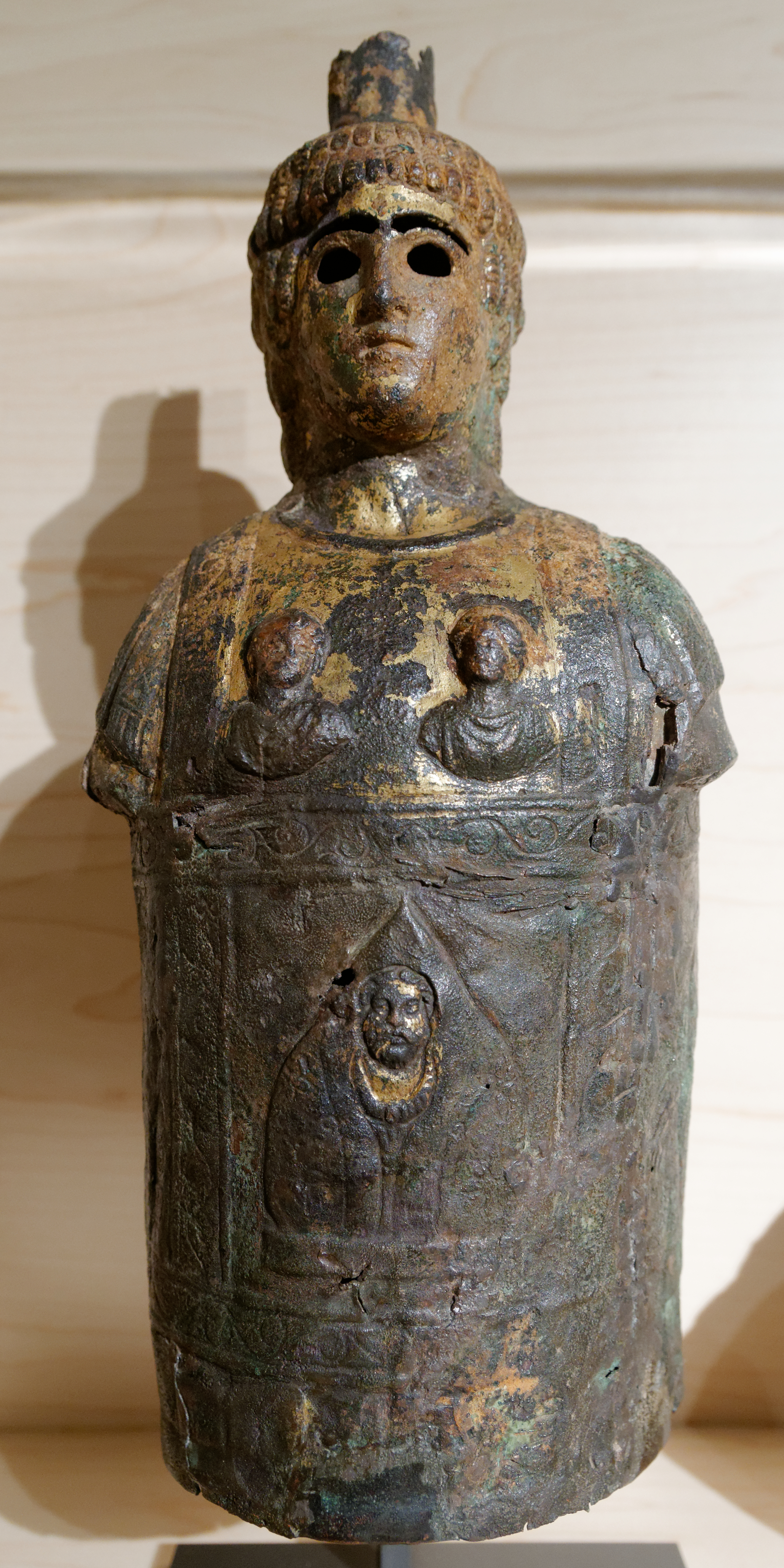
The Donato bronze from Baalbek, at the Louvre

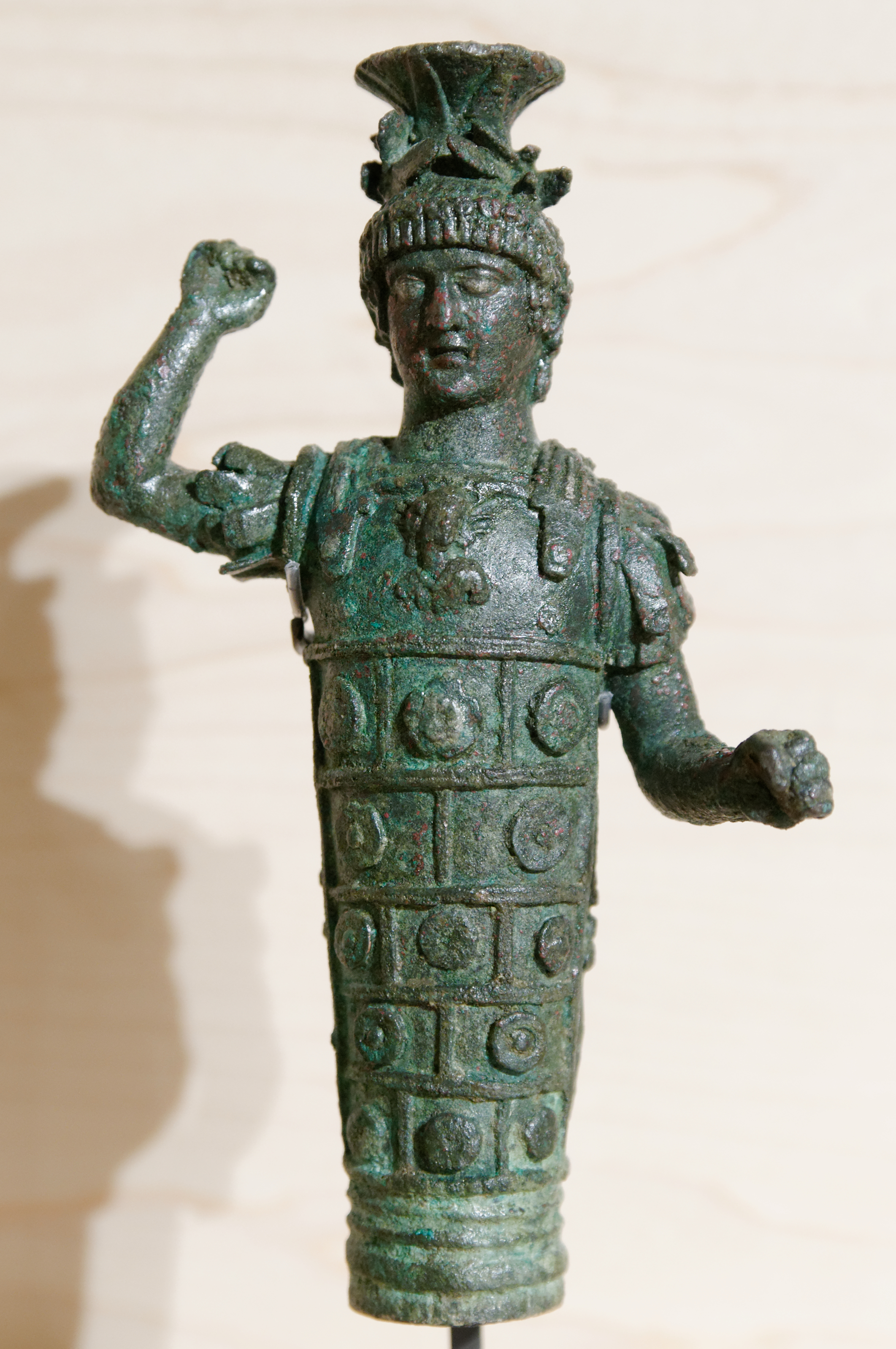
Bronze from the region of Tartus (Syria), at the Louvre

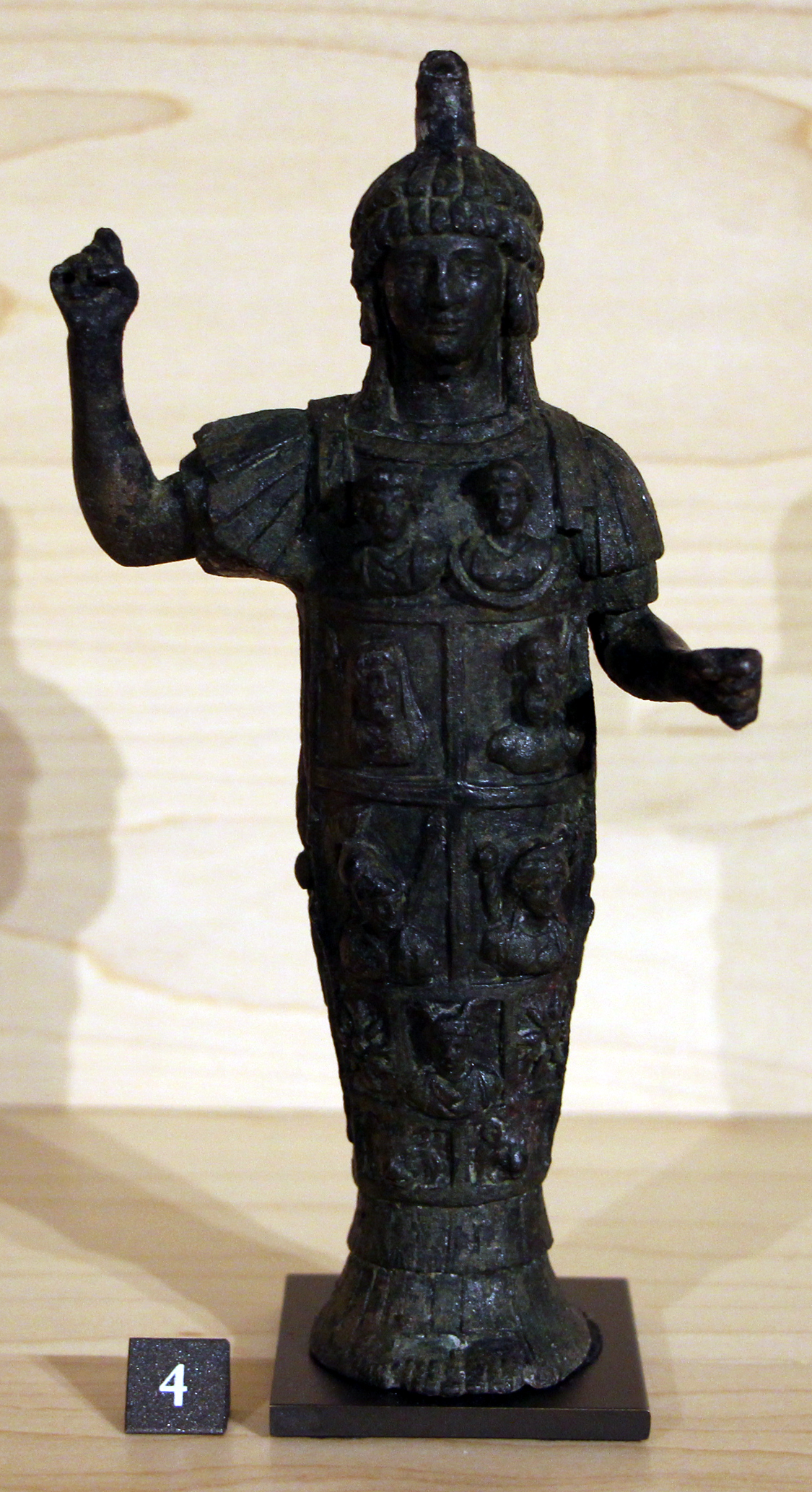
Bronze from Tartus, at the Louvre (Note: The Sursock bronze and this Tartus exemplary provide the most accurate surviving representation of the cult statue of Jupiter Heliopolitanus at Baalbek.)

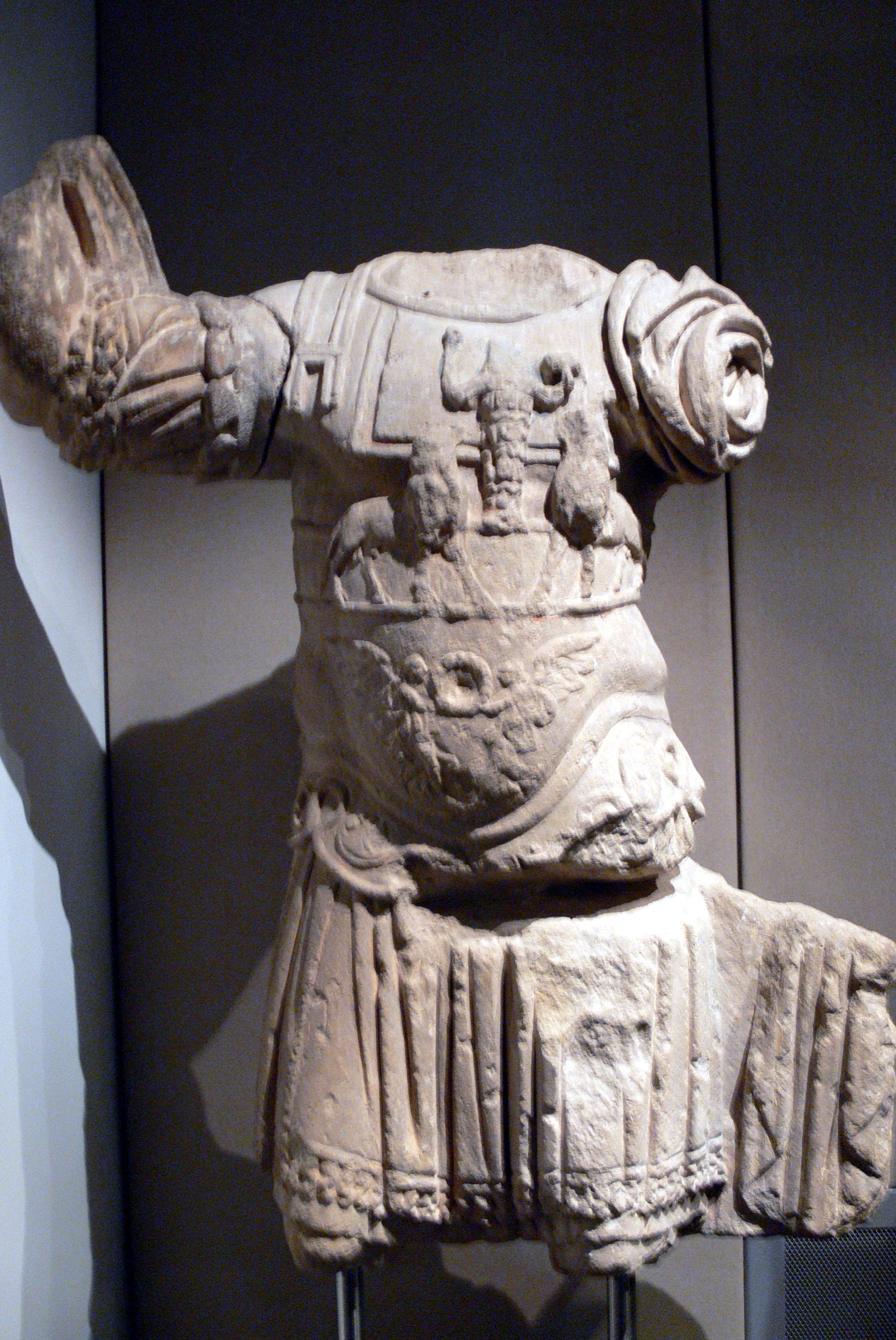
Armored statue of a Roman emperor, from Austria, at Museum Carnuntinum

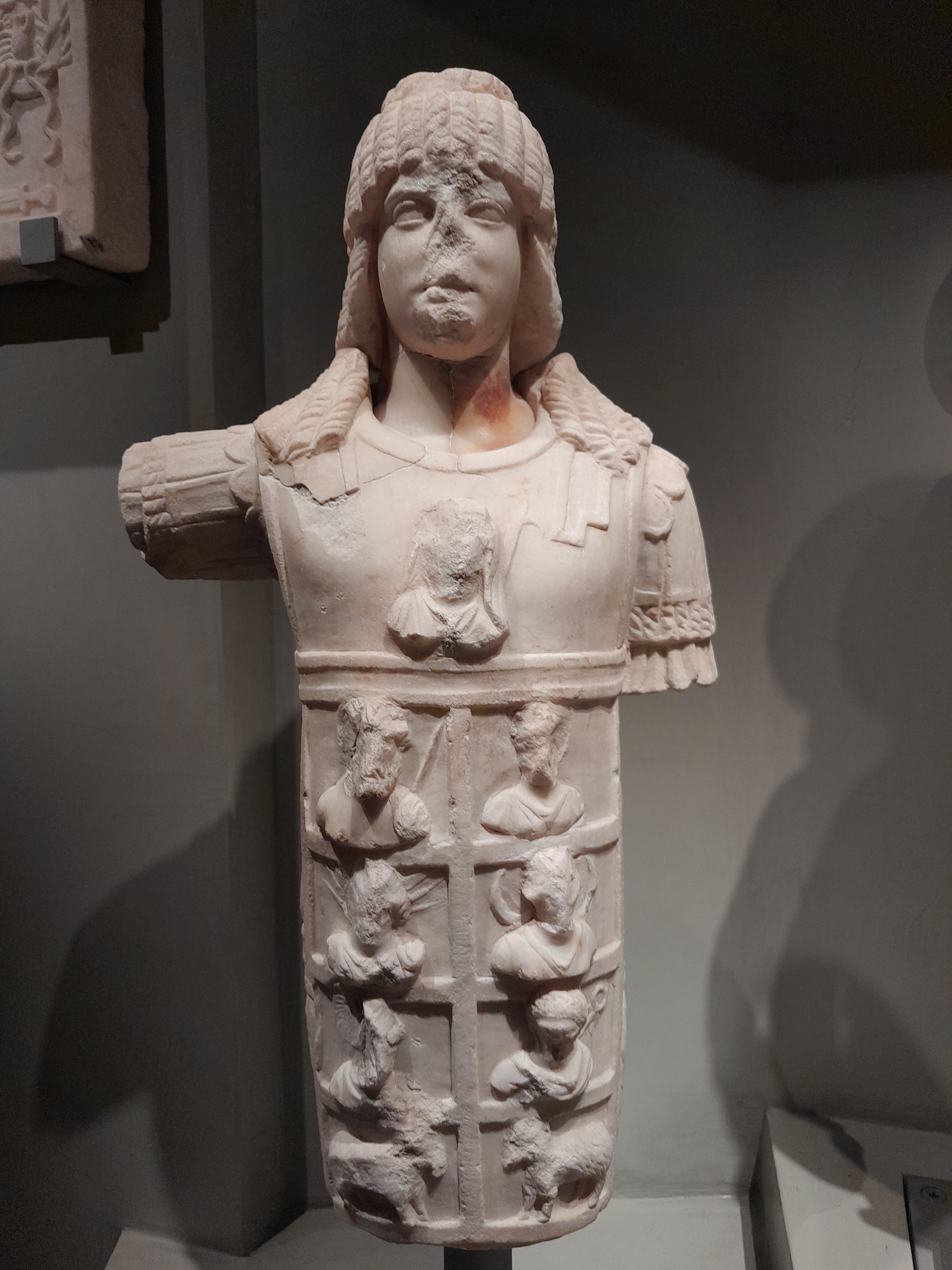
Marble statuette from the Acropolis, at the Acropolis Museum of Athens

=== Deities of the days of the week ===
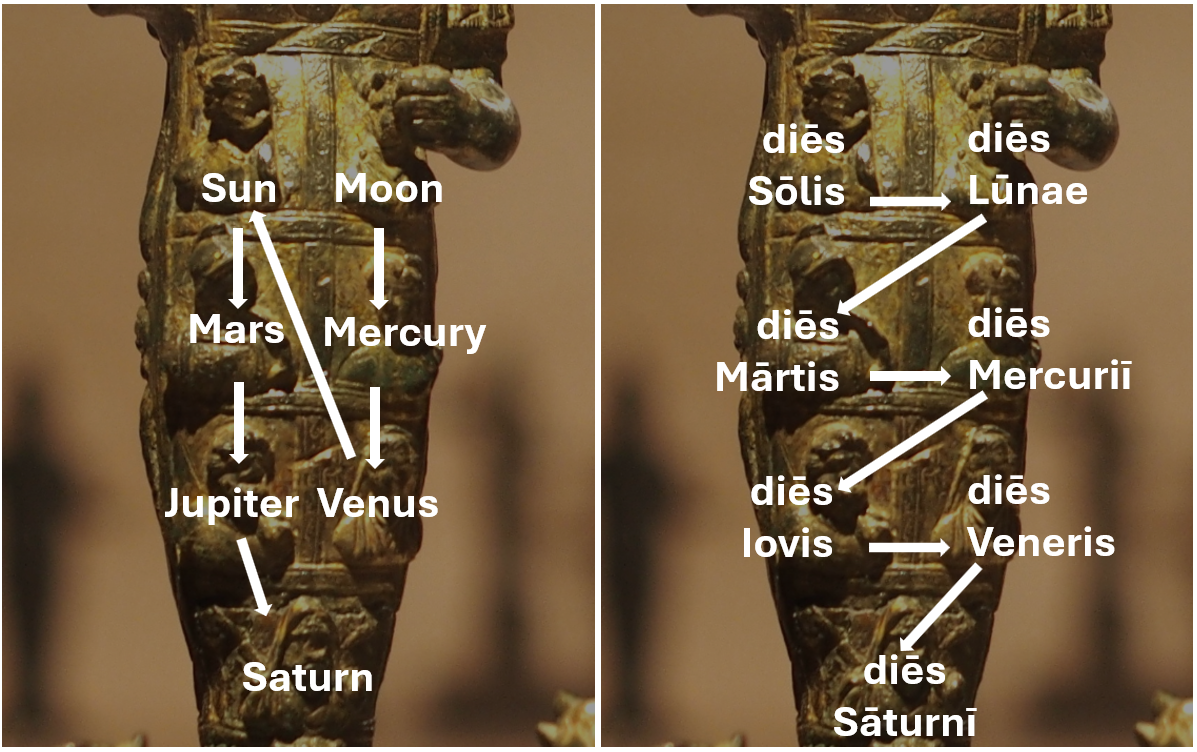
Arrangement of the deity busts on the Sursock bronze, as discussed by Franz Cumont. The sequence on the left reflects the ancient geocentric model, arranging luminaries and planets by their perceived distance from Earth. The sequence on the right follows the planetary rulers of the days of the Roman week.

Writing in 1921, the Belgian archaeologist and historian Franz Cumont argued that the spatial arrangement of the busts of the deities associated with celestial bodies follows two significant orderings: when read top to bottom and right to left, the sequence Moon-Mercury-Venus-Sun-Mars-Jupiter-Saturn represents their distance from Earth according to Chaldean and later Alexandrian astronomers; when read left to right, the sequence Sun-Moon-Mars-Mercury-Jupiter-Venus-Saturn corresponds to the days of the week. Cumont further posits that the busts of the Sursock bronze provide the first evidence that the planetary week played a crucial role in the cultic practices of the Heliopolitan clergy. This idea is supported by evidence of daily planetary prayers in Harran (in modern-day Turkey) and similar practices in the Mithraic mysteries, suggesting that Syrian cults and Iranian Mithraic religion helped spread the use of the astrological week throughout the Latin world. According to the French scholar and curator Nicolas Bel, the imagery of the bust deities illustrates how, in the Roman Imperial period, Jupiter Heliopolitanus came to be seen as a universal, cosmic force connected with the movement of the planets, the passage of time, and prophecy, a conception that gained wide popularity across the empire. According to the American scholar David C. Parrish, Near Eastern religious traditions, like the cult of Jupiter Heliopolitanus, were among the key influences that contributed to the rising popularity of artistic depictions of the planetary gods of the week in Roman art during the second and third centuries AD, particularly under the Severan dynasty. This trend was also driven by widespread astrological beliefs attributing to the planets the power to shape individual fate, and by the adoption of the seven-day week.

=== Lion's head ===
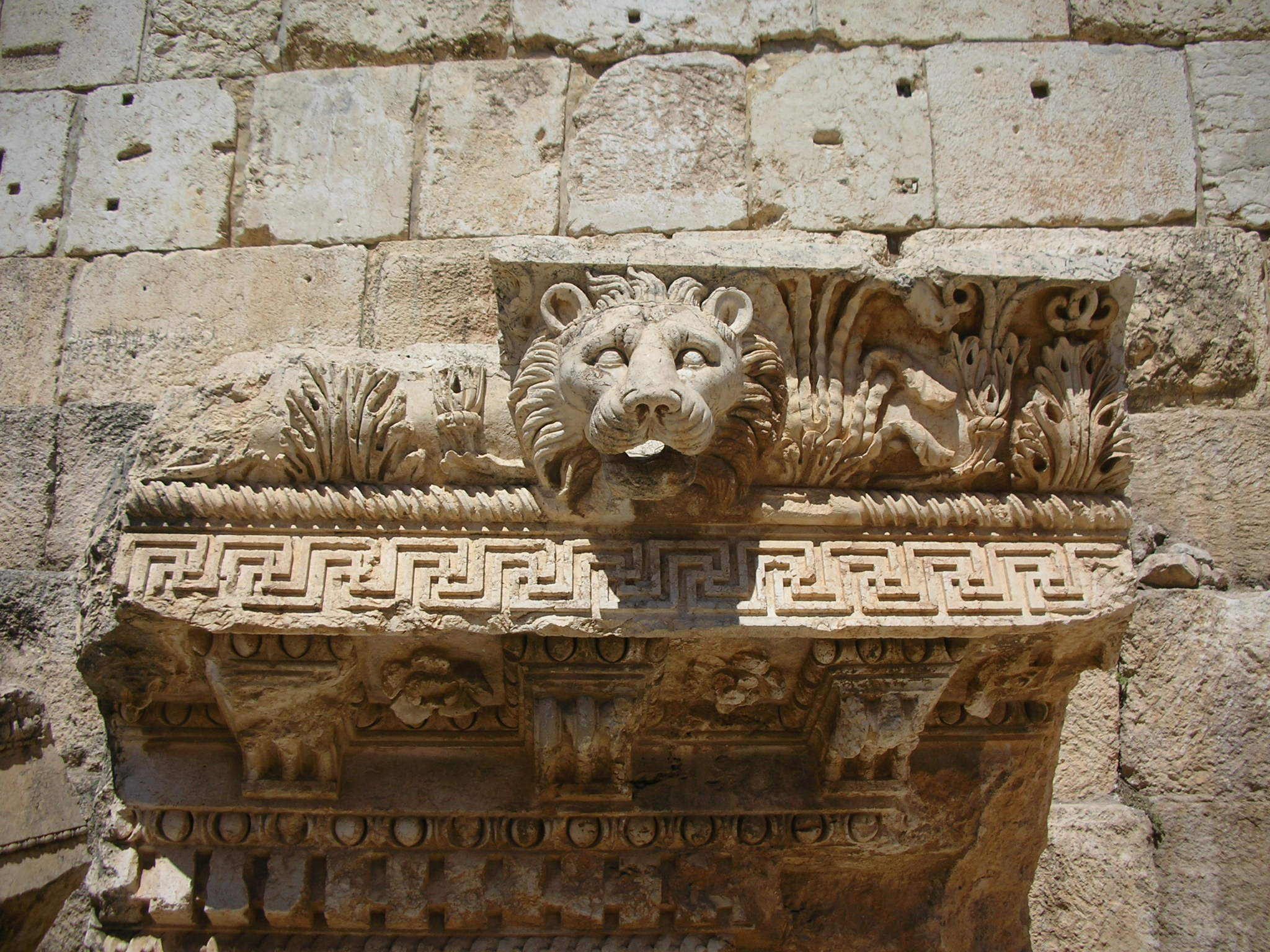
A lion's head carved into the frieze of the entablature in situ at the foot of the Great Temple of Baalbek

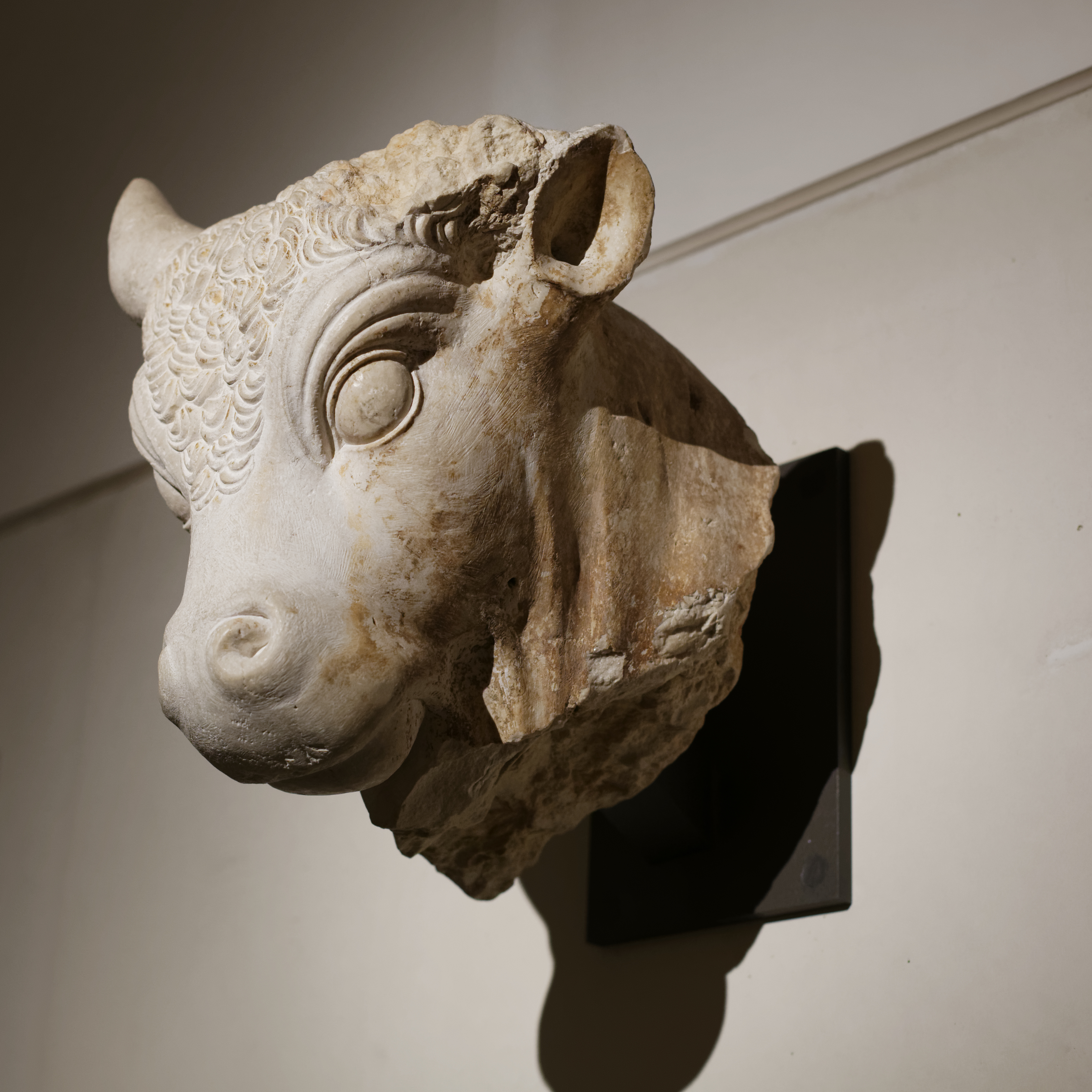
A bull's‑head ornament from the same temple, now housed in the Louvre.

The lion's head and bucranium (bull's head) are recurring architectural motifs in the Great Temple of Baalbek.

In his 1920 monograph, Dussaud identified the lion's head at the lower front of the dress as a representation of the god Gennaios, regarded as a solar deity venerated at Baalbek. Kropp (2010) proposed that Gennaios may not be a distinct deity but derives from the Aramaic GNYʾ, linked to the Arabic concept of jinn (جن), denoting a divine or powerful entity rather than a proper name. He also suggested that the lion's head represents an attribute indicating divine status, applicable to multiple gods rather than symbolizing a unique deity.

In 1956, the French Jesuit priest and archaeologist René Mouterde published findings regarding two previously undocumented inscriptions from Lebanon relating to Jupiter Heliopolitanus, the second of which references "I.O.M.H. regulo". Mouterde interpreted the title regulus in its astronomical context, (Note: Regulus is also known in Greek sources as "Basiliskos" and in Babylonian texts as "Sarru", both meaning king.) referring to the brightest star in the constellation Leo, thereby identifying the solar god of Baalbek with the Lion. Mouterde observed that this astronomical association is reflected in the material culture, noting the presence of lion imagery on multiple Jupiter Heliopolitanus representations. He suggested that the leonine motif was a symbol with both solar and astral significance. The solar aspect relates to the deity's identification with Apollo-Helios, while the astral aspect relates to Leo's status as the sun's celestial house in ancient astronomy. According to Mouterde, this interpretation may also explain the architectural decoration of Baalbek's main temples, where alternating bull and lion motifs potentially represent the deity's dual nature as both Hadad and a solar-stellar deity. Other scholars presented different views: Cumont suggested that the lion's head and the winged disk adorning the front of the bronze may have held astrological or cosmological significance, though he acknowledged that its precise meaning remains uncertain. He further proposed that the lion's head might also serve as an attribute of Saturn. Hajjar suggested that the lion motif represents an attribute of the goddess Athena-Allat.

== Cultural and institutional significance ==
The Sursock bronze is the showpiece of the Louvre's Department of Oriental Antiquities Roman Levant collection; it was formerly part of the Charles Sursock collection. In 1920, René Dussaud, then Deputy Curator of the Department of Oriental Antiquities, selected the Sursock bronze as the subject for the article inaugurating the first issue of Syria, a leading journal for French archaeological research in the Levant. A stylized rendering of the sculptural group was adopted as the logo of the Institut français d'archéologie de Beyrouth and the Institut français d'archéologie du Proche-Orient, French archaeological research institutes and the forerunners of the Institut français du Proche-Orient.

== See also ==
- Law school of Berytus – Ancient school of Roman law, to 551 AD
- National Museum of Beirut – Museum in Lebanon
- Roman temple of Bziza – Cultural heritage building in Bziza, Lebanon
