= Haeger =

Haeger is a surname. Notable people with the surname include:

- Annie Haeger (born 1990), American Olympic sailing contestant
- Charlie Haeger (1983–2020), American baseball player
- Lauren Haeger (born 1992), American softball player

== See also ==
- Haeger Potteries
- Hager
- Hagger
