= Hagar (disambiguation) =

Hagar is a biblical person in the Book of Genesis, handmaid of Sarah (the first wife of Abraham) and mother of Abraham's son Ishmael.

Hagar may also refer to:

- Hagar in Islam
- Hagar (name)
- Hagar, Ontario, a community in the Canadian province of Ontario
- Hagar Township, Michigan
- Hagar (company), an Icelandic retail company, part of the Baugur Group
- Ħaġar Qim, a megalithic temple complex found on the Mediterranean island of Malta, dating from 3600 to 3200 BC
- Hägar the Horrible, a comic strip by Dik Browne as well as the name of its main character
- 682 Hagar, a presumed asteroid
- Hagar the Womb, an English punk rock band

== See also ==
- Haggar (disambiguation)
- Hager, surname
- Hagger, surname
- Hajar (disambiguation)
