= Hajjar =

Hajjar is an Arabic word meaning stone. It may refer to:

- Hajjar (surname), a list of people with this name
- Ḥajjar Lamīs, a region of Chad
- Hajjar mountains in the Arabian peninsula

== See also ==
- Hajar (disambiguation)
- Al Hajar (disambiguation)
