= Hajjar (surname) =

Hajjar may refer to:

- A. (Abraham) William Hajjar, (1917–2000), American architect
- Bandar Al Hajjar (born 1953), Saudi Arabian economist
- Hana Hajjar, Saudi artist and political cartoonist
- Johnny Hajjar (born 1973), Martiniquais politician
- Joseph Hajjar (1923–2015), Syrian-born Melkite Catholic priest
- Katherine Hajjar, American pediatrician, cell biologist, and academic administrator
- Lisa Hajjar, American academic
- Mitra Hajjar (born 1977), Iranian actress
- Sleiman Hajjar (1950–2002), Melkite Catholic bishop of Canada
- Tony Hajjar (born 1974), Lebanese American drummer
