= Al Hajar =

Al Hajar is an Arabic placename meaning the stone. It may refer to:

- Al-Hajar, a village in the Northern Governorate of Bahrain
- Al Hajar, Yemen, a village in Al Bayda' Governorate, Yemen
- Al Hajar Mountains, located in northeastern Oman and eastern United Arab Emirates
- Al Hajar, Saudi Arabia, a municipality in the Governorate of 'Ula, Medina Region

== See also ==
- Al Hajjarah, Sana'a Governorate, Yemen
- Al-Hajarayn, Hadhramaut Governorate, Yemen
- Hajera, alternate name of Shaharah, seat of Shaharah District, 'Amran Governorate, Yemen
- Hajar (disambiguation)
- Hajjar (disambiguation)
