= Hagerstrom =

Hagerstrom or Hägerström is a Swedish surname. Notable people with the surname include:

- Axel Hägerström (1868–1939), Swedish philosopher and jurist
- James P. Hagerstrom (1921–1994), American Air Force pilot

== See also ==
- Hager
