= Hagger =

Hagger as a surname may refer to:

- Jean Hagger (1917–2008), Australian librarian
- Kim Hagger (born 1961), British athlete
- Lloyd Hagger (1898–1968), Australian rules footballer
- Nicholas Hagger (born 1939), British poet and author
- Peter Hagger (1944–1995), British trade unionist
- Rubeus Hagrid, a character in the fictional Harry Potter universe, referred to this way by his half-brother Grawp

== See also ==
- Hagar (disambiguation)
- Haggar (disambiguation)
- Hager
