= Jupiter Optimus Maximus Heliopolitanus =

Syncretic deity from the ancient city of Heliopolis

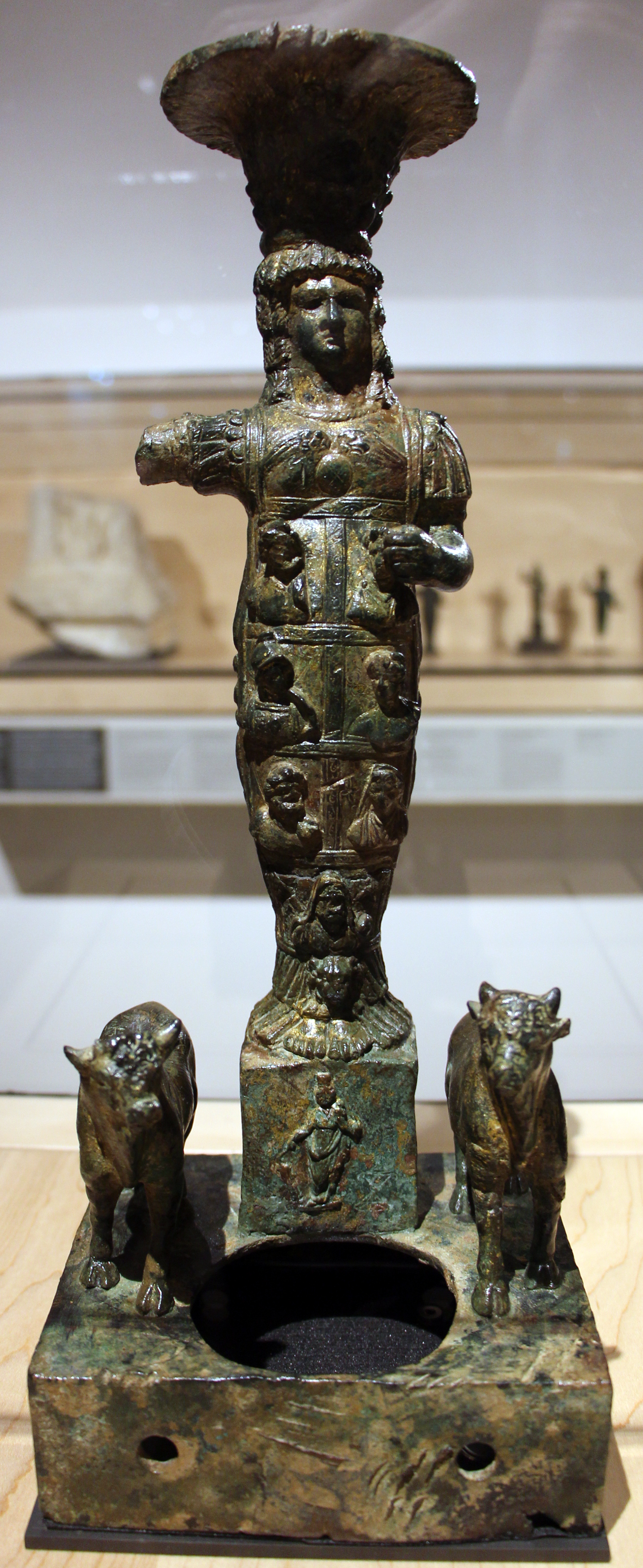
- The Sursock bronze, a miniature of the cultic statue of Jupiter Heliopolitanus in Baalbek, now in the Louvre
- Other names: Jupiter Heliopolitanus
- Venerated in: Baalbek; Polytheistic religion
- Symbol: Lightning bolt, Young bulls, Wheat corn

Equivalents
- Greek: Zeus Heliopolitanus

Jupiter Optimus Maximus Heliopolitanus (IOMH; also Jupiter Heliopolitanus) was a syncretic supreme god venerated in the great temple of Baalbek, in modern-day Lebanon. Scholars have variously connected the cult with earlier Levantine deities, particularly Baal-Hadad, while its Roman form incorporated attributes associated with Jupiter. The cult of Baal-Hadad in Baalbek acquired solar characteristics, possibly due to Hellenistic influences that equated Baal-Hadad with the Greek sun god Helios. This syncretism continued under Roman rule, with the deity further merging attributes with the Roman god Jupiter, culminating in the construction of a monumental temple complex dedicated to Jupiter Heliopolitanus in the second century AD. The temple was renowned for its oracular functions and served as a significant center of divination, with the cult of Heliopolitan Jupiter spreading throughout the Roman Empire.

== Historical background ==
The cult of Jupiter Heliopolitanus evolved from ancient Canaanite religion, specifically from the cult of the Canaanite god Baal-Hadad, an ancient storm and fertility god worshipped in various regions in the Near East, including Canaan and Syria. Baal is a title meaning "lord", "owner" or "master" and was used for various local gods. Hadad was known as the god of rain, thunder, and storms. He was associated with agricultural fertility and was often depicted holding a whip and thunderbolt. In different areas and periods, Baal-Hadad was associated with different natural phenomena and powers. Modern scholarship largely identifies Baal with Hadad. According to the ancient Near East scholar Alberto R. W. Green, the worship of Hadad, known as a great storm god, emerged in Syria in the second millennium BC. The god's attributes evolved as his worship spread westward from inland Syria. In the Middle and Upper Euphrates, Hadad was primarily seen as a fierce storm deity, bringing both destruction and renewal. In western Syria, his identity transformed to align with the region’s agricultural cycles. He gradually became known as Baal-Hadad and, over time, solely as Baal, becoming more closely associated with fertility and rain. His battles with the god Mot came to represent the seasonal cycle of drought and renewal. The German scholar Wolfgang Hermann suggested the name Baal (Lord) was adopted as a reverent alias when the cult of Hadad increased in importance and his true name became too sacred to speak aloud for any but the high priest. This practice parallels other cultures where substitute titles were used for deities whose names were considered too holy as "Bel" was used for Marduk among the Babylonians and "Adonai" for Yahweh. Other scholars propose that Baal was a native Canaanite deity whose cult was identified with or absorbed aspects of Hadad's. Regardless of their original relationship, by the first millennium BC, Hadad and Baal were regarded as distinct deities, with Hadad worshiped by the Aramaeans and Baal by the Phoenicians and other Canaanites.

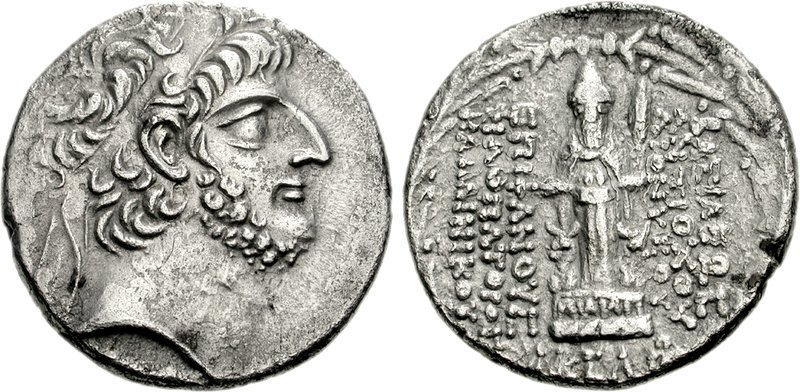
Antiochus XII Dionysos. 87/6-84/3 BC. AR Tetradrachm (15.69 g, 12h). Damaskos mint. Dated SE 230 (83/2 BC). Diademed head right / Cult statue of Hadad standing facing on double basis, holding wheat stalk, flanked by two bull foreparts; in exergue, monograms flanking date; all in laurel wreath.

After the death of Alexander the Great in 323 BC, the Diadochi (his generals and companions) divided and ruled over various parts of his empire; this era became known as the Hellenistic period, marked by the spread of Greek culture and influence across the territories they controlled. Control of the Levant was contested among the successors. The Seleucid Empire, led by Seleucus I Nicator, and the Ptolemaic Kingdom of Egypt, under Ptolemy I Soter, were primary rivals in this struggle. Following the pivotal Battle of Ipsus in 301 BC, much of the Levant came under Seleucid rule. An early sanctuary existed in Baalbek well before the Macedonian conquest. During the Hellenistic period, it was placed under the authority of the tetrarchs of Chalcis ad Libanum, who also held the title of "high priest". It is also during this period that the cult of Baal Hadad in Baalbek gained a solar character. The Greeks may have recognized their sun god Helios in Baal-Hadad, a storm god often depicted brandishing a whip, symbolizing lightning. The whip was also a symbol associated with Helios, who was often depicted holding a whip to drive his sun chariot across the sky. This shared iconography likely led to the conflation of the two deities by the new Hellenistic overlords who also renamed the town Heliopolis. This name is often interpreted as evidence for the worship of a solar deity, most likely originated during the Ptolemaic control of the region in the third century BC. The name Heliopolis, shared with the famous Egyptian city, was used by the priests of the Egyptian Heliopolis to misattribute the origins of the cult of Baalbek to their own traditions, as recounted by the Roman historian Macrobius (Saturnalia, early 5th century AD), who added to the myth by reporting that the cult statue of Jupiter Heliopolitanus in Baalbek originally came from Egypt. Modern scholars dispute this claim, recognizing it as part of the broader syncretic tendencies of Roman historians. The association of the god of Baalbek with solar attributes endured following the annexation of the region by Rome in 63 BC. (Note: In 15 BCE, Heliopolis was adjoined to the territory of "Colonia Iulia Augusta Felix Berytus", and was no longer under the authority of the indigenous Iturean princes of Chalcis. It maintain however good relations with the princes, who held control over southern access for pilgrims coming from Palestine, Arabia, or Damascus.) The cult of Hadad found its way to Rome, where he was mentioned in three inscriptions on an altar uncovered on the eastern slopes of the Janiculum hill. The inscriptions read: "to the god Adados", "to the god Adados of Libanos", and "to the god Adados of the Mountaintop", British classical archaeologist and scholar Arthur Bernard Cook suggested an increasing trend toward associating Hadad more with Jupiter, known as a mountain god, rather than with Helios. The cult of Hadad/Helios eventually syncretized with the Roman chief god Jupiter, evolving into a cosmic and universal deity. In the second century AD, the Romans built a monumental temple complex in Baalbek, dedicated to Iupiter Heliopolitanus (Heliopolitan Jupiter). The Temple of Jupiter Heliopolitanus in Baalbek was renowned in antiquity for its oracular functions and as a divination center. Macrobius records that during oracle sessions, the god's statue was carried in a litter by the bearers who, guided by divine will, moved in certain directions, which priests interpreted to deliver oracles. The cult of Heliopolitan Jupiter spread from this cultic center to the rest of the Roman empire. The ritual practices (Note: These include rites of divination and the oracular power of Jupiter, the dedication of hair to Venus Heliopolitana and the associated sacred prostitution, the prominence of astrology, ritual processions to the nearby 'Aïn el-Gouë spring with the deposition of divine images in the sacred spring's basins, liturgical banquets, ritual purification and hair shaving, the prohibition of pork, and the celebration of the Maiuma festival.) and cultic installations of the Temple of Jupiter Heliopolitanus in Baalbek (Note: The architectural layout of the grand sanctuary—with its two towers flanking the entrance to the temple complex, successive courtyards, isolated columns in the great court, elongated basins for ritual ablutions, and monumental multi-story altar adjacent to a smaller communion sacrifice altar in the courtyard of the Great Temple.) still exhibited, even in Roman times, significant Semitic influences, as detailed by Hajjar.

== Association with other deities ==
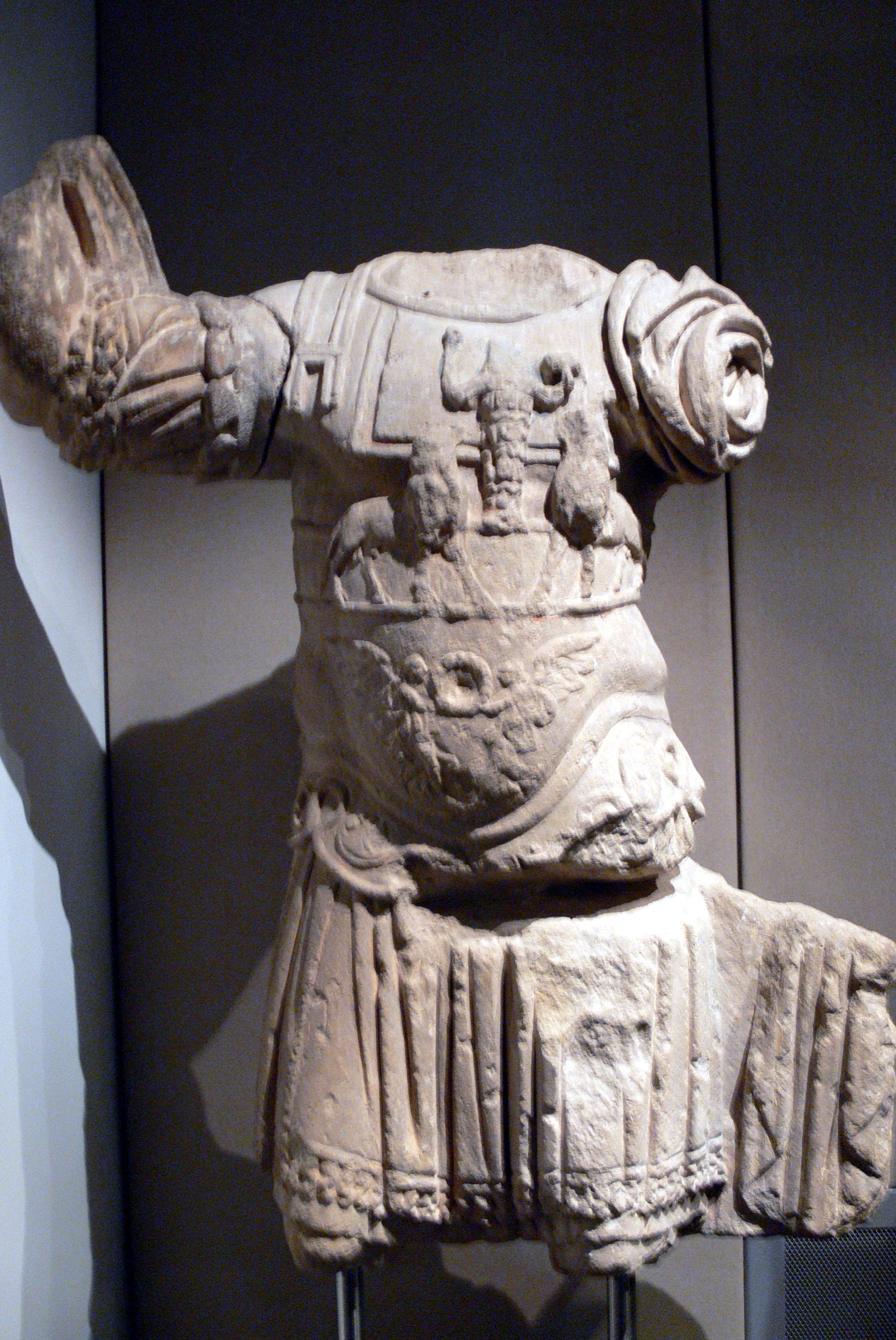
Second century AD armoured statue from Carnuntinum of a Roman emperor with relief of Jupiter Heliopolitanus on the breastplate.

In early modern scholarship, a cult to a supposed Heliopolitan Triad of Jupiter Heliopolitanus, Venus Heliopolitana, and Mercury (or Dionysus) was thought to have originated in ancient Canaanite religion, adopted and adapted firstly by the Greeks, and then by the Romans when they colonized the city of Heliopolis (modern Baalbeck) in the Beqaa Valley of Lebanon. The Canaanite god Baʿal (Hadad) was equated with Jupiter Heliopolitanus as sun-god, Astarte or Atargatis with Venus as his wife, and Adon, the god of spring, with either Mercury or Dionysus as third member of the triad, son of Heliopolitan Venus and Heliopolitan Jupiter. Scholarly reexamination of the archaeological and iconographic evidence suggests that the notion of a Heliopolitan Triad is a modern scholarly artefact, deriving from Roman perceptions of functional similarities between their own and local deities, the naming of local deities after Roman ones, and Roman deities after local ones, sometimes on very slender grounds. According to Kropp, there is no archaeological, epigraphic or iconographic evidence for any stable, familial or functionally effective triple grouping within the native Heliopolitan or Canaanite pantheons, and none for the clear equivalence of leading Roman and Heliopolitan deities either prior to the likely Roman occupation during Rome's civil wars, in Julius Caesar's time at the earliest, or its promotion as a colony some 100 years later.

== See also ==
- Hadaranes – Local storm deity of Roman Lebanon
