= David Hajjar =

David P. Hajjar
- Born: David Phillip Hajjar; September 13, 1952 (age 74); Lawrence, Massachusetts
- Citizenship: United States
- Education: University of New Hampshire; Weill Cornell Medicine; Rockefeller University
- Known for: Cardiovascular research; Science diplomacy
- Spouse: Katherine Hajjar
- Awards: Fellow, AIC (1984); Fellow, AAAS (1997); Fellow, RSM (1999); Fulbright Scholar, US DoS (2010); Jefferson Science Fellowship, US DoS (2014); Fellow, American Academy of Arts and Sciences (2016)
- Scientific career
- Fields: Cardiovascular disease
- Workplaces: Rockefeller University; Weill Cornell Medicine; United States Department of State; Brookings Institution

David P Hajjar (born September 13, 1952) is an American scientist, university administrator, and professor of pathology and biochemistry at Cornell University. He is best known for his work in arterial cholesterol trafficking.

== Biography ==
Hajjar received his B.A. in 1974 from American International College in Springfield, Massachusetts. He received his M.S. in biochemistry in 1977 and his Ph.D. in biochemistry in 1978, both from the University of New Hampshire. From 1978 to 1980, he completed postdoctoral training in pathology at Weill Cornell Medicine/Cornell University in New York City, and from 1980 to 1981, he completed postdoctoral training in biochemistry at Rockefeller University. Since 1981, he has served on the faculty of Weill Cornell Medicine as Professor of Pathology and Biochemistry, including as the Frank Rhodes Distinguished Professor of Cardiovascular Biology and Genetics. In 2016, he was elected University Distinguished Professor by Cornell University. During the course of his research career, he has published approximately 200 papers on the pathogenesis of cardiovascular diseases.

Hajjar served on the administration of Weill Cornell Medicine, including as Director of the Center for Vascular Biology for 15 years, Dean of the Graduate School for 16 years, and Executive Vice Provost of Medical Affairs for 10 years.

Among his honors and awards are elected membership in 2016 in the American Academy of Arts and Sciences. In 1995, Hajjar was awarded an honorary Doctorate of Science (D.Sc.), honoris causa, by American International College, and in 2014 he was awarded an honorary Doctorate of Humane Letters (D.Litt.), honoris causa, by the University of New Hampshire. He has received numerous research and educational awards from The American Society of Investigative Pathology over his career.

Recently, Hajjar has focused on science diplomacy and policy as they relate to human health and disease. He served on the Council on Foreign Relations and as a Senior Fellow at the Belfer Center for Science and International Affairs at the Harvard Kennedy School of Government, as a Fulbright Scholar, and as a Jefferson Science Fellow in the Office of International Health and Biodefense at the United States Department of State, and as a non-resident Senior Fellow at the Center for Middle East Policy at the Brookings Institution.

Hajjar is married to Katherine Hajjar.
