= Hajar =

Hajar may refer to:

== Places ==
- Hajar Mountains, mountains in northern Oman and also the eastern United Arab Emirates
  - Central Hajar Mountains, the central subrange of the Hajar, entirely in Oman
  - Eastern Hajar Mountains, the eastern subrange, entirely in Oman
  - Western Hajar Mountains, the western subrange, shared between Oman and the UAE

=== Facilities and structures ===
- Hajar an-Nasar, a fortress and sometime capital of northern Morocco
- Hajar Khatoon Mosque, ancient Muslim mosque (now a tourist destination) in the city of Sanandaj in the Kurdistan province of Iran.

== People ==
- Hajar Eddou (born 1999), Moroccan sprinter
- Pen name of Abdurrahman Sharafkandi, a Kurdish writer and poet

== See also ==
- Hadjar (disambiguation)
- Hagar (disambiguation)
- Al Hajar (disambiguation)
- Hajjar (disambiguation)
