= Haggar =

Haggar can refer to:

- a former district of Bahrain (historical region)
- Haggar Clothing, an American manufacturer of men's clothing.
- Douglas J. Haggar (born ca. 1947), real name of Mr. Whitekeys, American musician/entertainer
- Mike Haggar, a character in the Final Fight franchise.
- William Haggar (1851-1925), film-maker and showman.
- Witch Haggar, a character in the Voltron franchise.

== See also ==
- Hagar (disambiguation)
- Hager
- Hagger
