= Al Hajjarah =

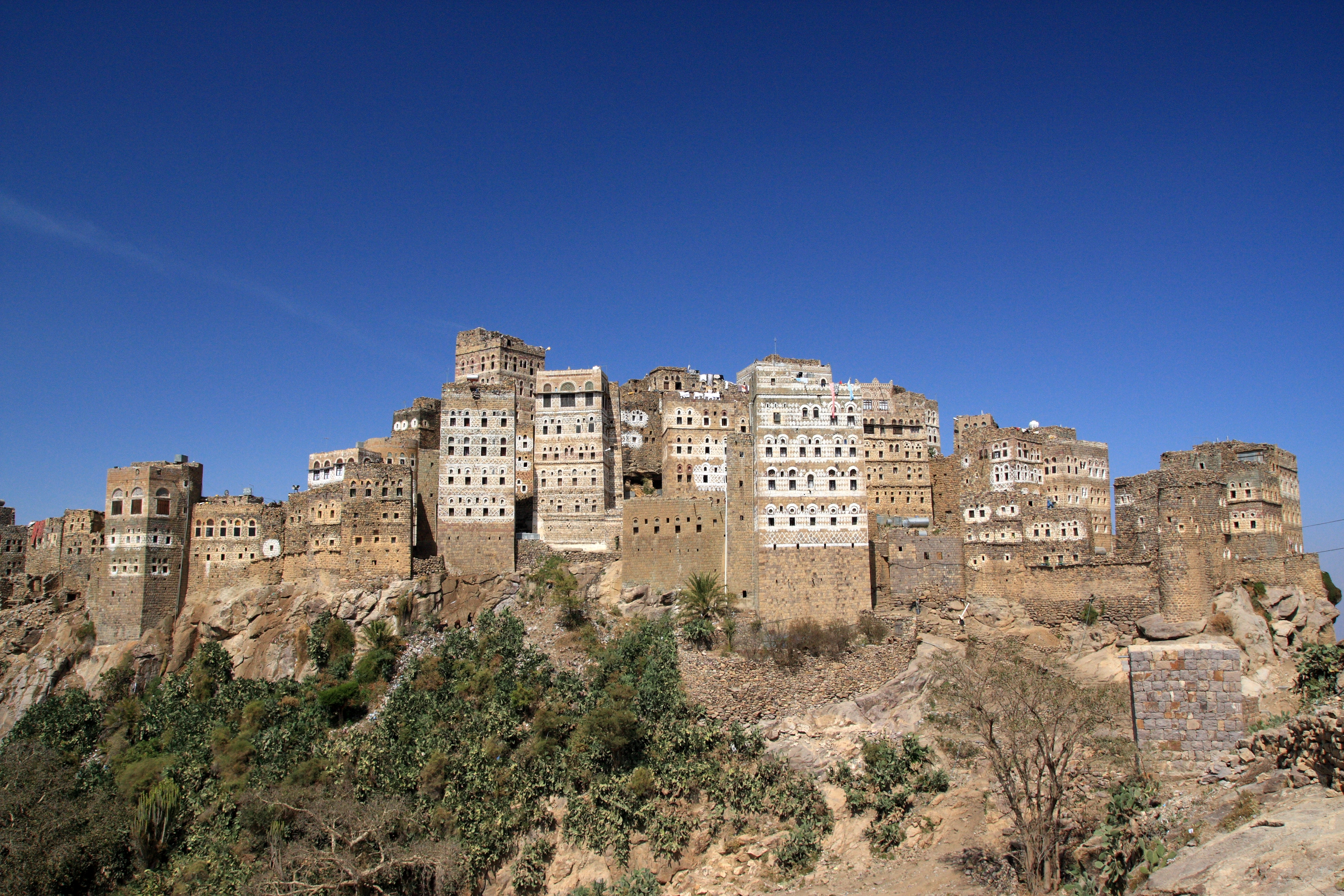

- Location in Yemen
- Coordinates: 15°4′3″N 43°43′2″E
- Country: Yemen
- Governorate: Sanaʽa
- District: Manakhah
- Elevation: 6,096 ft (1,858 m)

Population
  - Total: 2,500
- Time zone: UTC+03:00 (Yemen Standard Time)

Al Hajjarah (Arabic: الهجرة; sometimes spelled Al Hajarah or Al Hajjara) is a village in Yemen. It is located in the Manakhah District of the Sanaʽa Governorate, in the Haraz Mountains. It is a former market town, lying along the Sana'a-Al-Hudayda road, and today is used as a base camp by trekkers.

Al Hajjarah is built upon a precipice and is famous for its towering houses which are built onto the cliff faces. Its citadel was founded in the 12th century by the Sulaihids, and became an important fortification during the Ottoman occupation of Yemen, given the strategic importance of the location. Al Hajjarah is known to be a producer of pepper.

Al Hajjarah contains the former residence of Imam Yahya Muhammad, a signatory to the Italo-Yemeni Treaty of 1926.
