= Heliopolitan Triad =

In early modern scholarship, a cult to a supposed Heliopolitan Triad of Jupiter Heliopolitanus, Venus and Mercury (or Dionysus) was thought to have originated in ancient Canaanite religion, adopted and adapted firstly by the Greeks, and then by the Romans when they colonised the city of Heliopolis (modern Baalbeck) in the Beqaa Valley of Lebanon. The Canaanite god Baʿal (Hadad) was equated with Jupiter Heliopolitanus as sun-god, Astarte or Atargatis with Venus Heliopolitana as his wife, and Adon, the god of spring, with either Mercury or Dionysus as third member of the triad, son of Heliopolitan Venus and Heliopolitan Jupiter.

The Romans were thought to have built magnificent temples for the Heliopolitan Triad as the ruling deities of Heliopolis, rather in the manner of the colonial temples built to their own Capitoline Triad, and for much the same reasons; to foster a Roman identity and co-operation. The take-over of Heliopolis involved the establishment of Roman priesthoods and magistracies; but only two inscriptions at Heliopolis and 4 at Beirut are dedicated to Jupiter, Venus and Mercury. Nearly 30 at Heliopolis and 11 at Beirut are dedicated to Jupiter alone.

The recognition and promotion of local deities in forms that recalled the structure and relationships of Rome's Capitoline Triad was a long-standing feature of Rome's expansion, an appeal to what was held in common by different cultures in their empire. At the same time, the value of local deities was in their uniquely local identity and differences. For scholars exploring those identities and differences, seeking out and finding Triads with somewhat mystifyingly distant connections was a legitimate and self-perpetuating feature of Middle Eastern studies; observed differences and similarities of cults and deities could be explained as aspects of syncretism. Kropp asserts that especially with reference to Heliopolis, compounded identities such as Jupiter-Haddad, or Venus-Atargatis, et al are "never addressed with Semitic names, and rarely if ever depicted with visual contaminations. [...] Our difficulties in keeping them apart are thus no licence to conflate them. The principle should be not to multiply names and epithets more than absolutely necessary."

Scholarly reexamination of the archaeological and iconographic evidence suggests that the notion of a Heliopolitan Triad is a modern scholarly artefact, deriving from Roman perceptions of functional similarities between their own and local deities, the naming of local deities after Roman ones, and Roman deities after local ones, sometimes on very slender grounds. Some very late (4th century) and extravagant claims by Macrobius for multiple aspects of single or compounded identities involve a plethora of Roman, Greek and mid-eastern deities, including Jupiter of Heliopolis as a sun-god, at least partly on the grounds that "Helios" is a Greek name for the sun, and the sun-god. There is, however, no archaeological, epigraphic or iconographic evidence for any stable, familial or functionally effective triple grouping within the near-endless and various native Heliopolitan or Canaanite pantheons, and none for the clear equivalence of leading Roman and Heliopolitan deities either prior to the likely Roman occupation during Rome's civil wars, in Julius Caesar's time at the earliest, or its promotion as a colony some 100 years later.

== Sources ==
- Dąbrowa, Edward, http://orcid.org/0000-0002-9324-9096 Jagiellonian University in Kraków in ELECTRUM * Vol. 27 (2020): 255–258 doi:10.4467/20800909EL.20.022.12812 www.ejournals.eu/electrum. Review of Simone Eid Paturel, Baalbek-Heliopolis, the Bekaa, and Berytus from 100 BCE to 400 CE: A Landscape Transformed (Mnemosyne Supplements – 426), Brill, Leiden–Boston 2019, 343 pp., 68 figs.; ISSN 2352-8656; ISBN 978-90-04-40058-0
- Kropp, Andreas, J. M., "Jupiter, Venus and Mercury of Heliopolis (Baalbek): Images of the "Triad" and its alleged Syncretisms," Syria, 87, 2010, Institut Francais du Proche-Orient, pp. 229-264, jstor link registration required, retrieved 20 October 2021
- Kropp, Andreas, J. M., Images and Monuments of Near Eastern Dynasts, 100 BC - AD 100, Oxford University Press, 2013 googlebooks link, 20 October 2021
- Millar, Fergus, Rome, the Greek World, and the East, "Volume 3: The Greek World, the Jews, and the East", May 2011, pp. 177–182, ISBN 9780807876657
- Paturel, Simone Eid, "Baalbek-Heliopolis, the Bekaa, and Berytus from 100 BCE to 400 CE: A Landscape Transformed", in Mnemosyne Supplements, History and Archaeology of Classical Antiquity, Brill, 2019, link to googlebooks preview accessed 20 October 2021
- Dussaud, René, "Temples et cultes de la triade héliopolitaine à Ba'albeck", in: Syria 23 (1-2), 1942, pp. 33–77 (in French).
