= Ependytes =

Sewn garment in Ancient Greece

The ependytes (Greek: ἐπενδύτης), also romanized as ependytis, was an ancient tunic-like overgarment of Persian or "Eastern" origin that became known in Classical Greece. It is described as a broad woolen or linen coat worn over the chiton (basic tunic) or trousers (anaxyrides). The name derives from the Greek verb ependuo (to put on over), indicating its function as an outer wrapper. The ependytes was riginally associated with Median/Persian men's dress. By the late fifth century BC, it had also been adopted as an exotic luxury item and was worn by Greek women and children.

== Origins and historical context ==
The ependytes entered Greek culture through contact with the Persian Achaemenid world. In the late Classical period (4th century BC), Greek artists often depicted Persians and other "foreigners" wearing the ependytes beneath their mantles. A marble funerary statue discovered in the Kerameikos cemetery of Athens shows a seated Persian dignitary clad in a long-sleeved chiton under a kandys cloak. A study by the Greek National Museum notes, "the ependytis and the kandys were adopted in classical Athens, as a sign of outlandish luxury and a means of social visibility". Despite its originally being men's clothing, by the late 5th-4th centuries BC the ependytes was worn mostly by high-status Athenian women and children at festivals, whereas it was seldom worn by native Athenian men because, in Greek perception, men from the East were associated with femininity.

== Design, materials, and style ==
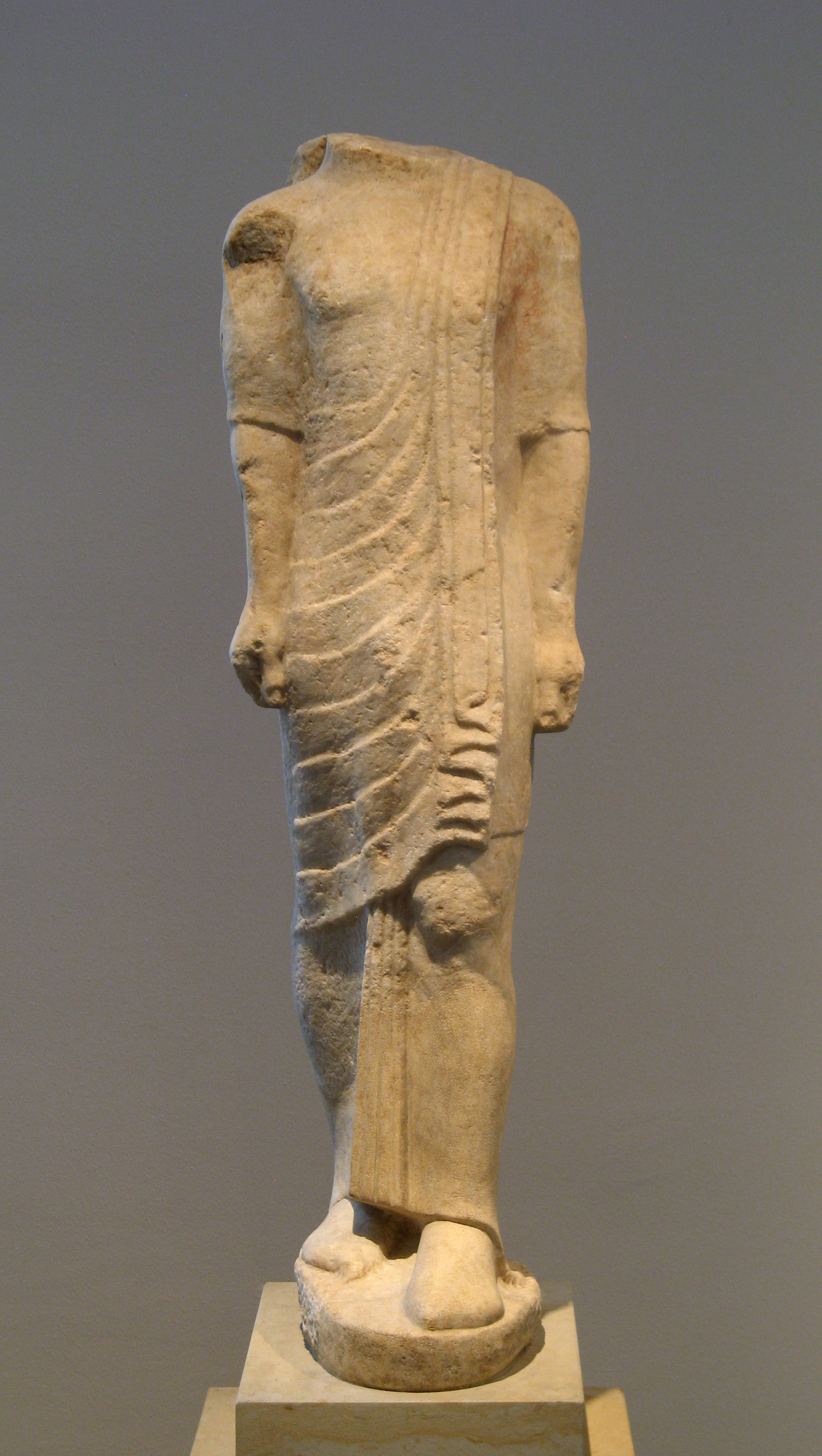
Statue of a young man wearing a chiton, ependytes, and cloak

The ependytes was a tunic-like coat reaching roughly to the waist, thighs, or knees. It was typically made of wool or linen, and was often brightly colored. The garment could be sleeveless or have short sleeves; it was fastened or belted at the waist in some depictions. A prominent decorative feature was a broad embroidered or woven border, frequently of the parakymatios (sea-wave) pattern. In Attic vase-painting, ependytai are drawn as richly ornamented garments, sometimes with geometric or floral registers across the fabric. A comic theater costume inscription describes Athenian actresses wearing a short, belted ependytes over their chitons. According to a detailed dress lexicon, its "primary purpose was to add decorative luxuriousness to dress", signifying the wearer's wealth.

== In writings and material evidence ==
Evidence for the garment comes from literary texts, inscriptions, sculpture, and vase painting. In Athenian funerary sculpture (fourth century BC), figures of Persians and their attendants frequently wear short coats identified as ependytai under their cloaks. Red-figure vase paintings from Attica and Southern Italy show Dionysus and Amazons wearing a multi-colored ependytes. On a fifth-century krater from Kerch, Dionysus is painted as bearded and returning from Asia, wearing a multi-colored ependytes over his chiton. Comic and tragic plays also allude to the garment. A fragment of Sophocles (fifth century BC) mentions weaving "linen ependytai". The second-century AD lexicon of Julius Pollux lists ἐπενδύτης as an "upper garment", and elsewhere ancient commentaries equate it with the Persian chitoniskos (a short tunic) mentioned by Herodotus. In Greek art, Amazons are often shown in "pseudo-Persian" costume including patterned ependytai over their chitons. Elite Athenian girls might wear a decorative ependytes as part of their Brauronic festival attire. Choruses of musicians and dancers, also used the ependytes as a costume to suggest exoticism on stage. Scholars have identified the ependytes in the ephebic oath and armament ceremonies of Athens. In the ephebia (the military training of Athenian youths), new soldiers are depicted receiving spears and shields while clad in a richly patterned tunic believed to be the ependytes. One red-figure pelike (circa 430 BC, Kleophon Painter) shows a boy about to depart for military service wearing a thick, belted tunic with geometric designs, an outfit noted by the MFA Boston as "very close to the ceremonial tunic called the ependytes". The ependytes could mark a ritual transition, like the handing over of arms, in classical Athens.
