= Hager =

Hager is the surname of several people:

- Åke Häger (1897–1968), Swedish gymnast
- Albert David Hager (1817–1888), American geologist
- Alice Rogers Hager (1894–1969), American writer, journalist, and traveler
- Alva L. Hager (1850–1923), American politician
- Axel Hager (born 1969), German beach volleyball player
- Bob Hager (politician) (1961–2025), American politician in Iowa
- Britt Hager (born 1966), American football player
- Cassie Hager (born 1984), American basketball player
- Chris Hager, guitarist with heavy metal band Rough Cutt
- David Hager, American physician
- Friderich Christian Hager (1756–1795), Danish colonial commander and governor
- Gerhard Hager (1942–2025), Austrian politician
- Hager Twins, Jim (1941–2008) and Jon (1941–2009), American country music singers
- Henry G. Hager (1934-2024), American politician
- Isaac Hager (born 1970s), American real estate developer
- Jake Hager (born 1982), German-American wrestler and MMA fighter also known as Jack Swagger
- Jenna Bush Hager (born 1981), daughter of President George W. Bush
- John Hager (cartoonist) (1858–1932), American cartoonist
- John F. Hager (1873–1955), American politician
- John H. Hager (1936–2020), American politician
- John Sharpenstein Hager (1818–1890), American politician
- Jonathan Hager (1714-1775), founder of Hagerstown, Maryland, United States
- Kristen Hager (born 1984), Canadian actress
- Leopold Hager (born 1935), Austrian conductor
- Liz Hager, American politician
- Mandy Hager, New Zealand writer
- Mark Hager (born 1964), Australian field hockey player
- Mordechai Hager (1922–2018), American Hasidic rebbe
- Nicky Hager (born 1958), New Zealand author and investigative journalist
- Paul Hager (1925–1983), German theatre and opera director
- Peter Hager II (1784–1854), New York politician
- Robert Hager, American news analyst
- Rocky Hager, American football player
- Shraga Feivish Hager, rebbe of the Kosov Hasidic dynasty
- Steven Hager (born 1951), counterculture and marijuana activist
- Tobias Hager (born 1973), German football player

== See also ==
- Hagar (disambiguation)
- Hager, West Virginia
- Hager Group
- Haggar (disambiguation)
- Hagger
