= Katherine Hajjar =

Pediatric Hematology-Oncology researcher

- Education: Smith College; Johns Hopkins University
- Spouse: David Hajjar
- Scientific career
- Fields: Pediatrics, cell biology
- Workplaces: Cornell University

Katherine Amberson Hajjar is an American pediatrician, cell biologist, and academic administrator. She is the senior associate dean for faculty at Weill Cornell Medicine.

== Life ==
Hajjar earned a bachelor's degree from Smith College in 1974. She completed a M.D. from the Johns Hopkins School of Medicine in 1978. She completed a pediatric residency at Children's Hospital of Pittsburgh from 1978 to 1981. She was chief pediatric resident from 1981 to 1982. She conducted a pediatric hematology-oncology fellowship from 1982 to 1984. During this time period, she completed cellular biology research under Vann Bennett.

She joined Weill Cornell Medicine's department of pediatrics and medicine in 1984 where she researched under Ralph Nachman. From 1997 to 2002, she was the Stavros Niarchos Professor of Pediatrics. She chaired the department of cell and developmental biology from 2002 to 2014. She became the Brine Family Professor of Cell and Developmental Biology in 2005. She discovered the cell surface receptor for tissue plasminogen activator (annexin A2). Hajjar is an elected member of the Society for Pediatric Research, American Pediatric Society, American Society of Clinical Investigation, Association of American Physicians, American Clinical and Climatological Association, and the American Association for the Advancement of Science. She is the senior associate dean for faculty.

Hajjar is married to David Hajjar.
