= Hager, West Virginia =

Unincorporated community in West Virginia, US

Coordinates: 38°12′52″N 82°05′12″W

Hager is an unincorporated community in Lincoln County, in the U.S. state of West Virginia.

== History ==
A post office called Hager was established in 1906. Edward Hager, an early postmaster, gave the community his name.
