= Jean Hagger =

Australian librarian (1917–2008)

Jean Hagger (11 October 1917 – 16 July 2008) was an Australian librarian, professional educator in librarianship and indexer. She was the foundation Head of the Department of Librarianship at the Royal Melbourne Institute of Technology (RMIT), Melbourne and the first female Head of Department in the same institution. She has been referred to as "a pioneer of education for librarianship in Australia".

== Early life and education ==
Margaret Jean Hagger was born on 11 October 1917 in Preston, Victoria. After completing her secondary school studies at Melbourne Girls' High School, she trained as a primary school teacher at the Melbourne Teachers' College. Her first teaching post was in a country school and then in 1943 she was working at the East Coburg Primary School. She responded to the request from that school's principal for a volunteer to set up a school library there.

She continued her professional education by undertaking courses and examinations with the Australian Institute of Librarians. Resigning from teaching, she studied for a B.A. at the University of Melbourne and worked part time in the University's library.

== Early career ==
In 1952 Hagger worked in the United States Information Service library in Melbourne. She went to the United States to gain work experience in the Carnegie Library of Pittsburgh and took the opportunity to audit librarianship classes in the nearby University of Pittsburgh which had "one of the leading American schools of librarianship". Returning to Australia she obtained a position in the Baillieu Library at the University of Melbourne and was a part time teacher in the Registration courses taught, mainly as evening classes, by the State Library of Victoria's library training school.

In 1960–1961 she returned to the United States to take up a Fulbright Scholarship to study at the School of Librarianship at the University of Illinois, following which was awarded a Master of Library Science degree.

Back in Australia she joined a committee set by the Victorian Branch of the Library Association of Australia to protest the State Library of Victoria's reduction of librarianship classes. The committee argued that, on the contrary, there should be an increase in the professional education of librarians in Australia.

== Royal Melbourne Institute of Technology ==
The protest led to the establishment in 1963 of a Department of Librarianship at the Royal Melbourne Institute of Technology (RMIT), Melbourne. Hagger was appointed as the foundation head of this department and was the first female head of any department at the RMIT.

From the beginning Hagger advocated that Australian education for librarianship follow the British model of librarianship education (featuring both undergraduate and postgraduate courses) as opposed to the North American model (in which for the main postgraduate courses were offered). A study tour of the United Kingdom confirmed her belief in her preferred model.

Under her tutelage the RMIT would offer from 1970 Australia's first undergraduate degree in librarianship, in addition to a one year postgraduate diploma in the field. Higher degrees in librarianship were offered from the mid-1970s. Ever interested in research in librarianship she would later endow the Jean Hagger Research Support Fund.

== Indexer ==
Upon her retirement from RMIT in December 1977 Hagger became a freelance indexer and was a foundation member of the Australian Society of Indexers. She created a number of published indexes, of which perhaps the best remembered are her indexes to six volumes of the Historical Records of Victoria.

== Personal life ==
Hagger was one of the founding members of the Australian branch of the women's service association Zonta International in 1965 and remained an active member for the rest of her life. Her leisure hours included regular visits to classical music concerts and to the opera.

She died on 16 July 2008 after a short illness following a stroke.

== Awards and honours ==
- 1964: Fellow of the Library Association of Australia
- 1998: Life membership of Australian Society of Indexers due to her "contribution to the Society and to the profession of indexing"

== Bibliography ==
=== Monographs ===
- Public Library Services in Victoria, Sydney: James Bennett, 1966 (Australian Library Pamphlets Series, 4).
- Librarianship For To-morrow's World, Melbourne: Ormond, [1969].
- Consolidated Index to the Checklists of Royal Commissions, Select Committees of Parliament and Boards of Inquiry, held in the Commonwealth of Australia Queensland, New South Wales, South Australia, Tasmania and Victoria, 1856-1960, Melbourne: Borchardt Library, La Trobe University, 1980 (Library Publications, 19). Joint authors: Tina Montanelli and D. H. Borchardt.
- AACOBS Documents Index, 1956-1981, Canberra, Australian Advisory Council on Bibliographical Services (AACOBS), 1982.
- Taiwan: A Comprehensive Bibliography of English-Language Publications, Melbourne: Borchardt Library, La Trobe University, and New York: East Asian Institute, Columbia University, 1984. Joint authors: J. Bruce Jacobs and Anne Sedgley. Online copy at Wayback Machine.
- Library Services for Australia : The Work of AACOBS. Index, Years 1956-70 to 1981-82, Canberra: Australian Advisory Council on Bibliographical Services, 1985.

=== Indexes ===
Indexes to each of the following books:

- Michael Cannon, ed., Historical Records of Victoria, Melbourne, Victorian Government Printing Office, 1981–1998, 7 volumes of which 5 were indexed by Hagger.
- Blanche d'Alpuget, Robert J. Hawke: A Biography, East Melbourne, Schwartz Publishing Group, 1982.
- Stephen Murray-Smith and Anthony John Dare, The Tech: A Centenary History of the Royal Melbourne Institute of Technology, Melbourne: Hyland House, 1987.

== Articles ==
- "Tall Oaks from Little Acorns Grow: The Establishment of the Department of Librarianship of RMIT", Australian Academic and Research Libraries, 12, March 1981, 59.
- "The Library Training School of the State Library of Victoria 1948-1962", Australian Academic and Research Libraries, 13, December 1982, 242.
- "Librarianship Courses and Australian Studies", Australian Historical Bibliography, July 1986, 42.
- "Filing is not as simple as ABC", Australian Society of Indexers Newsletter, 12, December 1988, 27.
