= Hagar (name) =

Hagar is both a feminine given name and a surname. Notable people with the name include:

Given name:

- Hagar Badran (born 1989), Egyptian synchronized swimmer
- Hagar Finer (b. 1984), Israeli WIBF bantamweight champion
- Hagar Olsson (1893–1978), Finnish writer, literary critic, playwright and translator
- Hagar Wilde (1905–1971), American writer and screenwriter
- Hagar Yanai (born 1972), Israeli writer

Surname:

- Albert Hagar (1827-1924), Canadian politician
- Mandy Hagar (b. 1960), New Zealand children's author
- Regan Hagar, drummer with Malfunkshun
- Sammy Hagar (b. 1947), rock musician
