= Joseph Hajjar =

Joseph Hajjar (1923–2015) was a Syrian-born priest in the Melkite Greek Catholic Church who was particularly known for historical works covering the fortunes of Christians in the Levant, concentrating on the nineteenth century. Hajjar's interests, however, covered wider spheres, including the permanent synod in the patriarchate of Constantinople down to the eleventh century, church history in modern times also involving the European territories of the Ottoman Empire and the question of Christian ecclesiastical tribunals in the Muslim world including their suppression in Egypt.

== Biography ==
Hajjar was born in Damascus, Syria in 1923, and became an ordained priest in Jerusalem in 1946. He was the director of the journal Concilium, which referenced the preoccupations of the Second Vatican Council, something that governed many of his publications. He also contributed to ISTINA.

A member of the Belgian Académie Internationale des Sciences Religieuses, Hajjar proved active in international associations in Germany and France, where he had earlier studied. He died in 2015.

== Selected works ==
- Un lutteur infatigable, le patriarche Maximos III Mazloum, Harissa (Lebanon) 1957.
- Le synode permanent (Synodos endemousa) de l'Eglise byzantine des origines jusqu'au XIè siècle, Rome 1962 (Orientalia christiana Analecta, no.164).
- Les chrétiens uniates du Proche Orient, Seuil 1962.
- L'Europe et les destinées du Proche-Orient (1815–1848), Bloud & Gay, 1970 (Bibliothèque de l'histoire de l'Eglise, collection publiée sous la direction d'Eugène Jarry).
- Le christianisme en Orient - Etudes d'histoire contemporaine (1684–1968), Librairie du Liban 1971.
- Le Vatican, la France et le Catholicisme Oriental, Beauchesne 1997.

=== In collaboration ===
- Ludovicus Jacobus Rogier, Guillaume de Bertier de Sauvigny, Joseph Hajjar: Nouvelle histoire de l'Eglise. 4 Siècle des Lumières, Révolutions, Restaurations, Seuil 1966.
- Roger Aubert, Jean Bruls, Paul E. Crunican, John Tracy Ellis, Joseph Hajjar, Frederick B. Pike: Nouvelle Histoire de l'Eglise. 5 L'Eglise dans le Monde Moderne, Seuil 1975.

== Sources ==
- Antoine Guillaumont, review of Joseph Hajjar, Les chrétiens uniates du Proche-Orient, in Revue de l'histoire des religions, vol.168 (1965), p. 211.
- Étienne Fouilloux, review of Joseph Hajjar, Le Christianisme en Orient-Etudes d'histoire contemporaine (1684–1968), in Archives des Sciences sociales des religions, vol. 31 (1971), p. 206-207.
- Étienne Fouilloux, review of Joseph Hajjar, Religion et Politique en Méditerrannée orientale (1878–1914), in Archives des Sciences sociales des religions, vol.50/2 (1980), p. 167-175.
