= Charlotte whale =

Whale fossil found in Vermont, United States

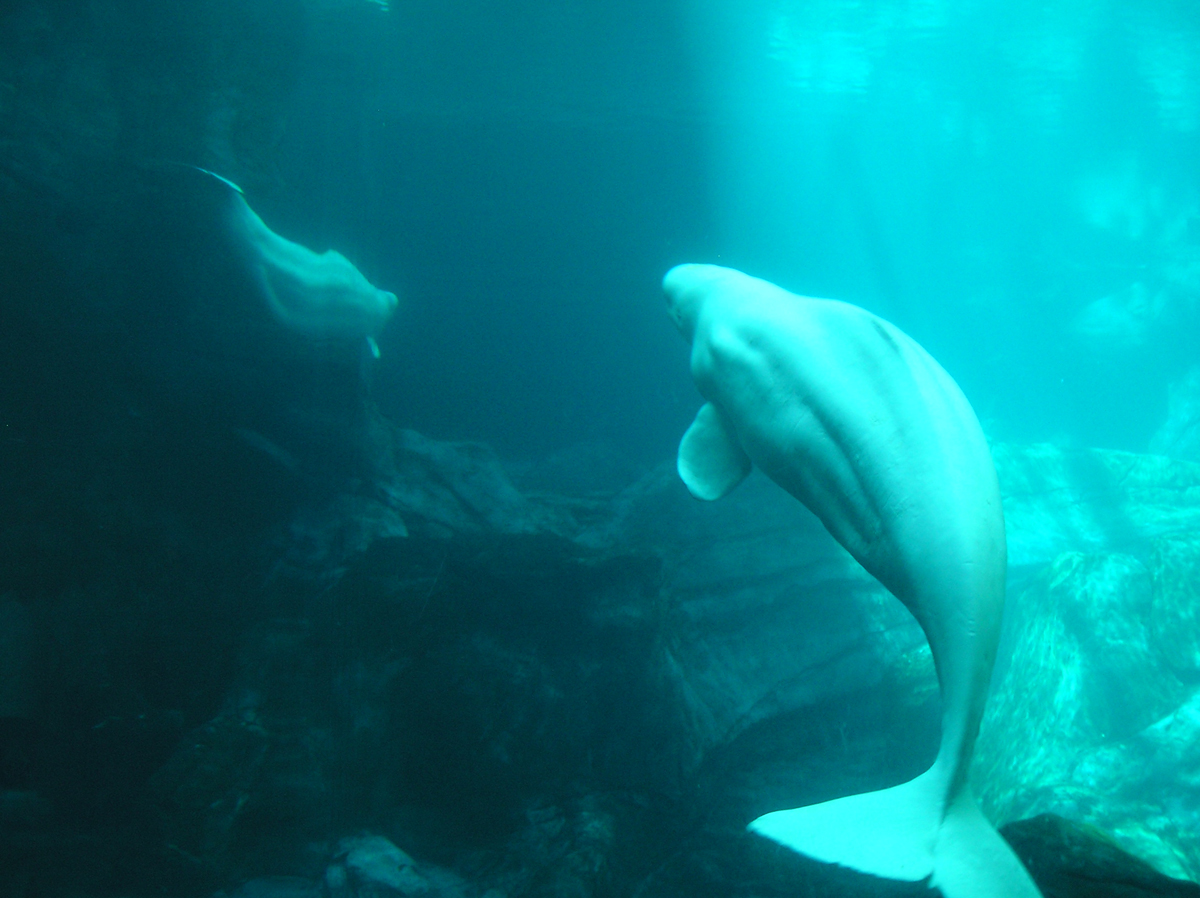
A pair of beluga whales

The Charlotte whale is the skeleton of a beluga whale that was found buried in sediment near Charlotte, Vermont in 1849. It is exhibited at the Perkins Museum of Geology at the University of Vermont. Found at the time when knowledge of Earth's natural history was nascent, it proved key evidence for developing a glacial theory of New England. The whale skeleton was collected by Zadock Thompson and reconstructed by Albert David Hager in an unusual, anatomically incorrect manner. Later, that error was preserved for its historical significance. It was Vermont's official state fossil from 1993 to 2014, after which it became designated as Vermont's state marine fossil.

== Discovery and preservation ==
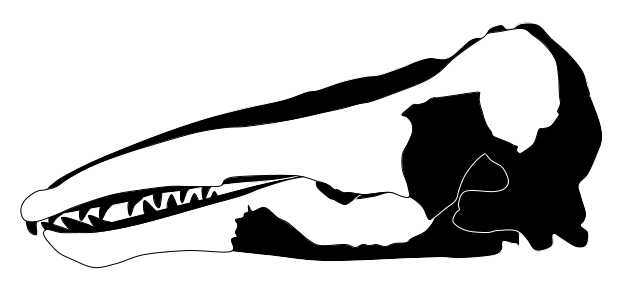
The restored fragment of the cranium and mandible of the Charlotte whale (white), compared to the skull of a modern beluga whale (black)

The whale skeleton was uncovered in 1849, during the construction of the Rutland & Burlington Railroad. The skeleton was found buried in a farmer's field, approximately 10 feet (3 m) below the surface. Initially, it was mistaken for a horse skeleton and part of the whale's skull was destroyed in continued digging until a local resident, who recognized the bones as "unusual", managed to stop the digging, which allowed naturalist Zadock Thompson to collect and preserve the bones. Thompson reconstructed the skeleton and helped identify it as a beluga whale.

Zadock Thompson died in 1856. Some time after, Vermont state geologist Albert David Hager bought the skeleton from Thompson's widow, to reconstruct and present it in Vermont's state natural history collection in 1861. He found the specimen to be in bad shape, and, while preparing it "created something that would look interesting to the public". There have been attempts to reconstruct it to make it anatomically correct, but Perkins Museum of Geology curator Jeff L. Howe wrote that it was "more important as a historical specimen than as an anatomical specimen"; therefore, it has remained in the form in which Hager assembled it. The skeleton survived a flood of the museum in 1927.

== Scientific significance and research ==
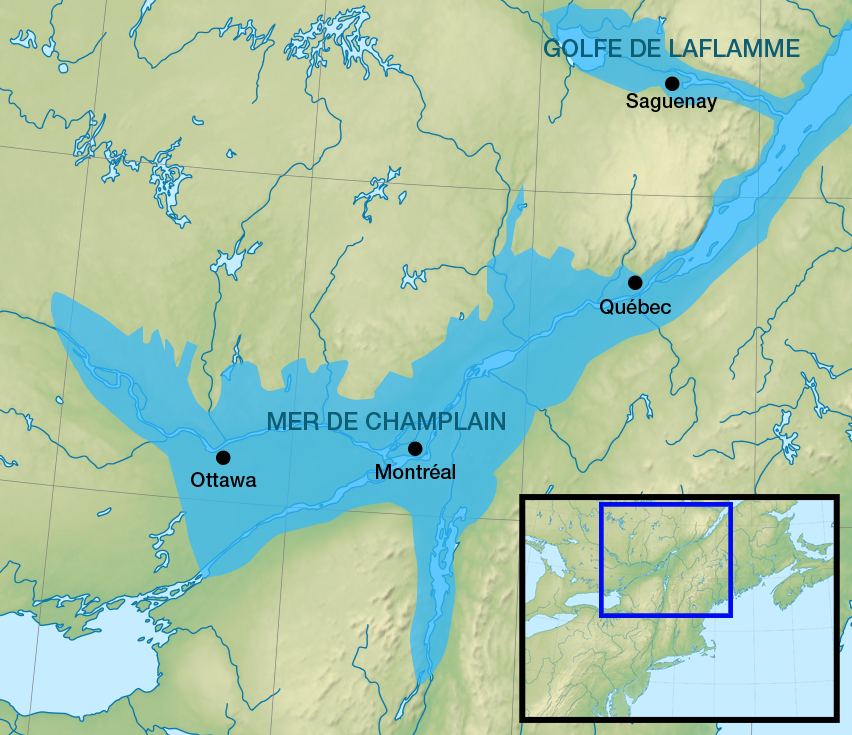
Prehistoric Champlain Sea - the whale skeleton was found in its long bay or estuary at the bottom of the map, south of Montréal

The Charlotte whale was the first of several whale skeletons found in Vermont, a landlocked U.S. state. In 1849, the discovery provoked a controversy, because initially, scientists were unable to account for how a skeleton of a marine mammal ended up buried in sediment 150 or 200 miles (240 or 320 km) from the nearest ocean shore. Some people attributed this to Noah's flood. Swiss geologist and biologist Louis Agassiz, who had produced the theory of glaciation and ice ages a decade earlier, based on his investigation of Alpine glaciers, was in Boston at the time and theorized that the same process happened in New England. According to Howe, the Charlotte whale and the woolly mammoth found near Mount Holly (a.k.a. the Mount Holly mammoth) found the previous year on the same railroad dig, were crucial evidence and motivation to research glaciation in New England.

The whale skeleton was found in the sediments of the Champlain Sea, a prehistoric sea that existed from approximately 12,500 to 10,000 years earlier in the modern-day Champlain Valley that had been formed by the melting glaciers at the close of the last glacial period. At that time, the area in which the sea was located had been depressed below the sea level by the enormous weight of the Laurentide Ice Sheet. After the ice melted, the land gradually rose through isostatic rebound over the ensuing millennia. The Charlotte whale was among the earliest evidence of this process in Vermont.

The skeleton is approximately 12 feet (3.7 m) long and thought to be an adult. Its sex has not been determined. Based on the sediment in which it was found, its age has been estimated at 11,000 or 11,500 years, but due to the way the skeleton was first preserved in 1849, it is impossible to use radiocarbon dating to determine the age of the skeleton.

== Legacy ==
The Charlotte whale was designated as the Vermont state fossil on June 6, 1993. In 2014, the Mount Holly mammoth was designated as the new state fossil, while the designation of the Charlotte whale was changed to being the state marine fossil. The whale skeleton is exhibited at the Perkins Museum of Geology at the University of Vermont.

== See also ==
- Reverence (sculpture)
