= Albert David Hager =

American historian

Albert David Hager

Albert David Hager (November 1, 1817 – July 29, 1888) was an American geologist, librarian and historian.

== Biography ==
Born and raised in Chester, Vermont, Hager received a common school education. In 1856, he was appointed assistant naturalist of Vermont. He was assistant state geologist under Edward Hitchcock 1857-1861, and state geologist and curator of the state cabinet of natural history 1862-1870. In 1870, he was appointed state geologist of Missouri, and in 1877 he became librarian of the Chicago Historical Society. Hager was commissioner from Vermont to the Paris Exposition of 1867.

Hager died in Chicago, Illinois on July 29, 1888.

== Works ==
- Geology of Vermont, with Prof. Hitchcock (2 vols., Claremont, New Hampshire, 1861)
- Annual Report of the Vermont Fish Commission (Montpelier, Vermont, 1866–1869)
- Economic Geology of Vermont
- Report on the geological survey of Missouri (1871)
