= Nemausus =

Gallo-Roman patron god of ancient Nîmes

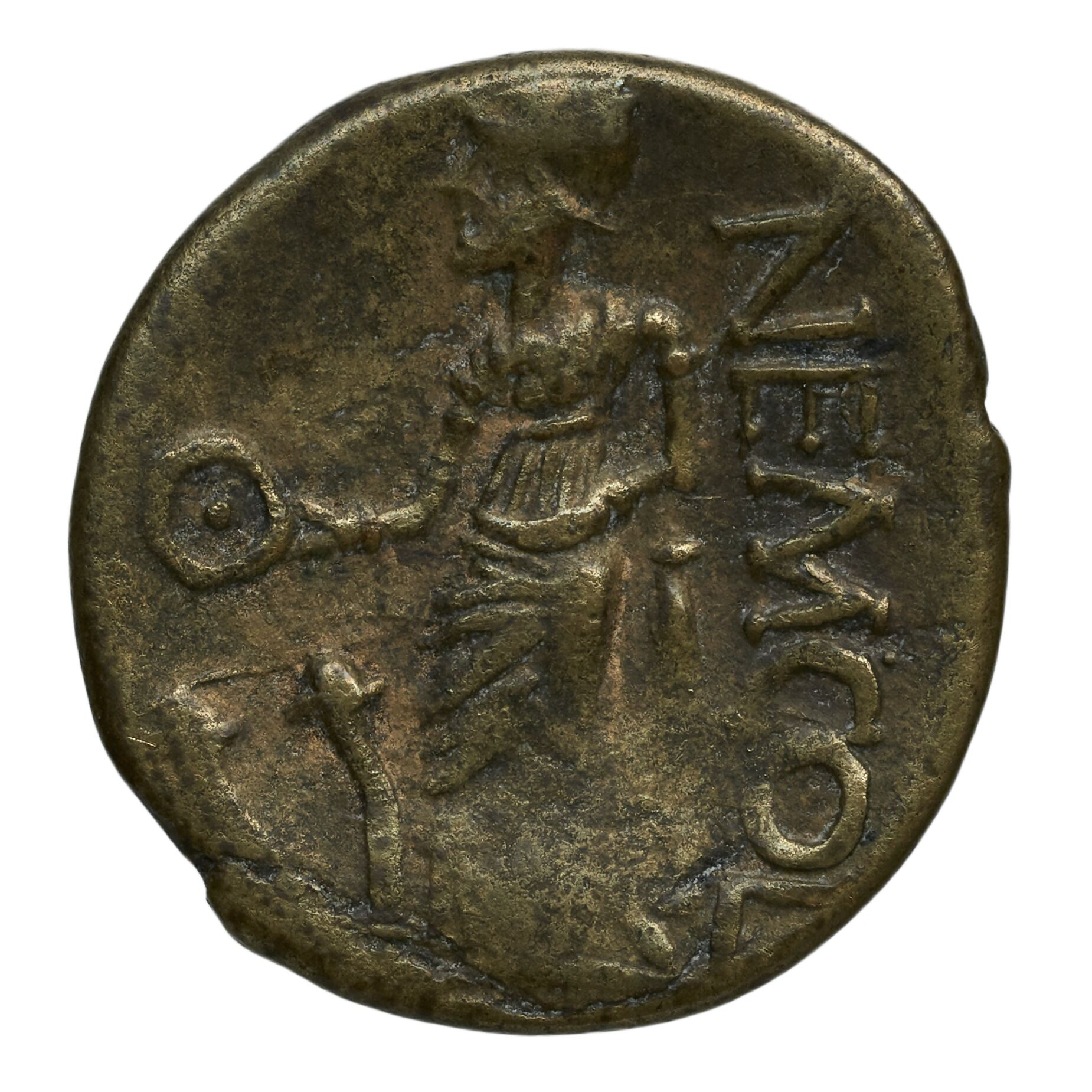
Bronze coin of colonial Nemausus showing a deity, possibly Salus or a personification of the colony (abbreviated NEM COL), pouring a libation from a patera over two serpents with horned or winged heads

In Gallo-Roman religion, Nemausus (Greek Νέμαυσος) was the local patron god of the Gallic oppidum of Nemausus, the hill-fort later refounded as a colonia under Roman rule, now Nîmes, France. His cultus was a focal point in the extensive cultural complex in the center of Nîmes, established no later than the 2nd century BC and continuing in the Roman era.

Several inscriptions name Nemausus as the recipient of votive offerings, often in association with other deities and the spring around which civic life developed in Nîmes. He seems to have served both as the source personified and therefore the provider of life-giving water, and as its defender, a role that reached its apex when an inscription of the 2nd–3rd century CE places Nemausus next to an instantiation of Jupiter and endows him with Mars-like attributes. (For clarity, in this article Nemausus will refer to the god, and the modern name Nîmes to the city.)

== Name ==
Many divine names from Nîmes and its subordinate towns in antiquity relate to deities of place, either natural or built. Miranda Green took Nemausus as a Celto-Ligurian name, the Ligurians being a pre-Celtic people of southern Gaul. More often, a Gaulish origin is assumed.

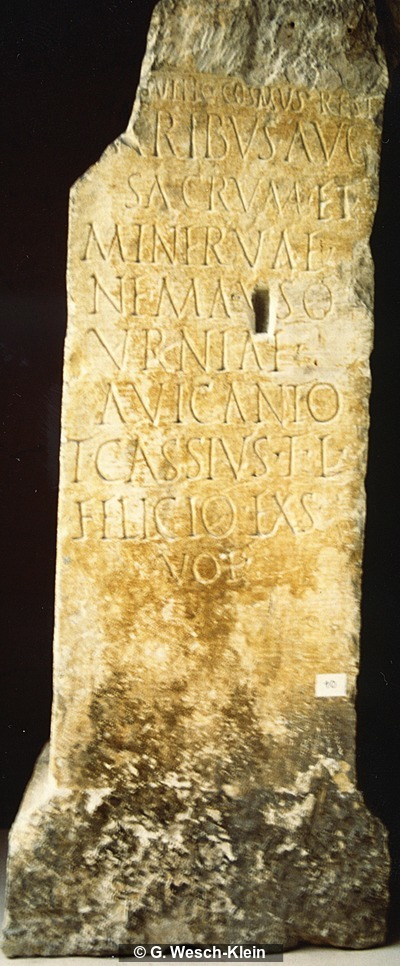
Altar dedicated to a group of deities, the Lares Augusti, Minerva, Nemausus, Urnia, and Avicantus

Nemausus seems readily related to the Gaulish word nemeton, "sanctuary, sacred grove, enclosure" analogous to Greek temenos, suggesting that the name might originally have been a toponym. Xavier Delamarre, however, does not include Nemausus in his discussion of place names in the nemeton entry of his dictionary of the Gaulish language (2nd ed.). In Gallo-Greek inscriptions, which predate the use of Latin in this part of Gaul, the spelling can be found as Nam- (Ναμ-) rather than Nem-.

In his 6th-century geographical dictionary, Stephanus of Byzantium preserves a derivation of the name of the Gallic town Nemausos from Nemausios, one of the Heracleidae. This story of the town's namesake is attributed to Parthenius of Nicaea and therefore dates no later than the 1st century BC. Parthenius had included a story about Heracles as progenitor of Gaul in his collection of stories about doomed or against-the-odds love affairs, Erotica Pathemata, where the hero is said to have begotten the race of Celts with Celtine, an indigenous princess. Whatever the linguistic or historical validity of this etymology, owing to Greek and Carthaginian influence in Gaul and Hispania, Heracles had developed a pre-Roman mythology through assimilation with Gallic deities, and several Gallic communities integrated Heracles into their founding legends. (Note: The literature on Heracles in Iberia and Gaul is expansive. See, for instance, Gérard Moirtrieux's tome of more than 500 pages, Hercules in Gallia. Recherches sur la personnalité et le culte d'Hercule en Gaule (2002); Pamina Fernández Camacho, "What Identity for Hercules Gaditanus? The Role of the Gaditanian Hercules in the Invention of National History in Late-Medieval and Early-Modern Spain," in The Exemplary Hercules (2019), and "Etymology and the Appropriation of Reality from Antiquity to the Renaissance: An Introduction," International Journal of the Classical Tradition (2021) 28.2, pp. 117–138.)

A common assumption is that the town was named for the god, but the reverse may be true: in some instances, eponymous deities such as Nemausus, Vesunna (the ancient name for Périgueux), and Vasio (Vaison-la-Romaine) are not in evidence before Roman domination, and may have been created to express community cohesion or establish tradition during a period when it was threatened. The earliest known inscription with Nemausus as a deity's name dates to the mid-1st century BC, around the time Parthenius was writing, but the name of the town was in use already. While Celtine appears to have been the genealogical creation of Parthenius, he would have invented the story about the Heraclid Nemausios to explain the preexisting deity of the spring at Nîmes.

== Topography ==
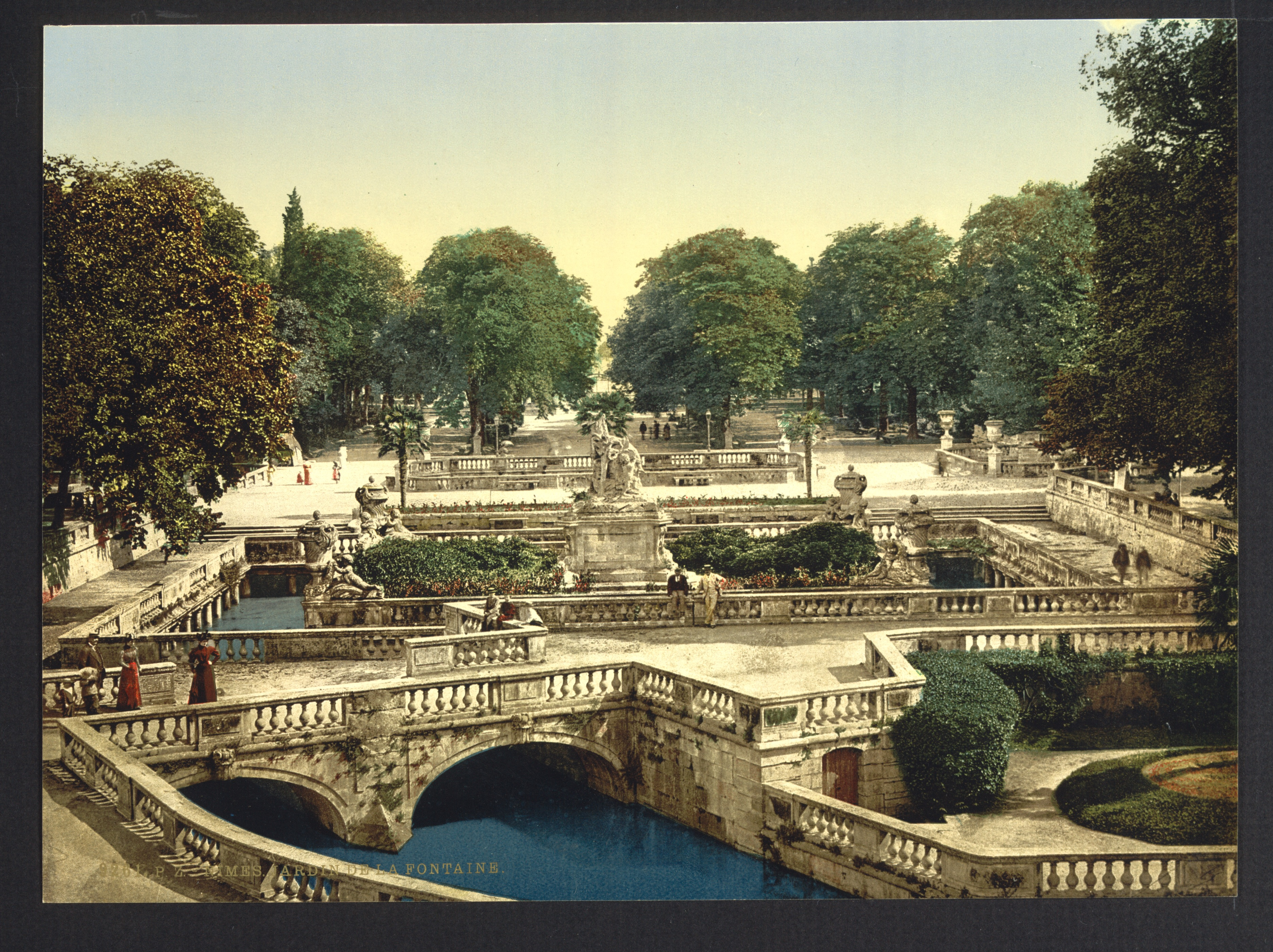
Photochrome print showing the Jardins de la Fontaine, built around the ancient spring, at the end of the 1800s

Before annexation into the province of Gallia Narbonensis, the nemeton of Nîmes would have been an open-air wooded space where assemblies were held by the Volcae Arecomici, the Celtic-speaking people who made treaty with Rome in 121 BC. In the early 1st century BC, a portico was built at the water source, and early in the reign of Augustus, as Nîmes experienced heightened prosperity and expansive development, the basin was further enclosed and monumentalized by edifices such as a nymphaeum.

In the topography of Nîmes, the sanctuary is identified as underlying the present-day Jardins de la Fontaine, extensively built over and reconstructed in the Neoclassical period to enhance its character as a locus amoenus, a cultivated garden park that should not be taken on appearance as an approximation of the ancient site. The adjacent ruin known popularly as the Temple of Diana was almost certainly not; in antiquity it is thought to have been a library or augusteum, and from 991 to 1562 it served as a church.

The fountain complex is overlooked by the Tour Magne, a hilltop stone tower on an octagonal base, its construction resembling the horologium in the Roman agora of Athens called the Tower of the Winds. The modern steps and ramps leading up to the tower were built over the small ancient theater. Offering a sweeping view of Nîmes, the Tour Magne was built in the Gallic era most likely as a watchtower and then rebuilt during Augustan development of the city, when its significance became more symbolic and sacred than defensive.

=== Horologium ===
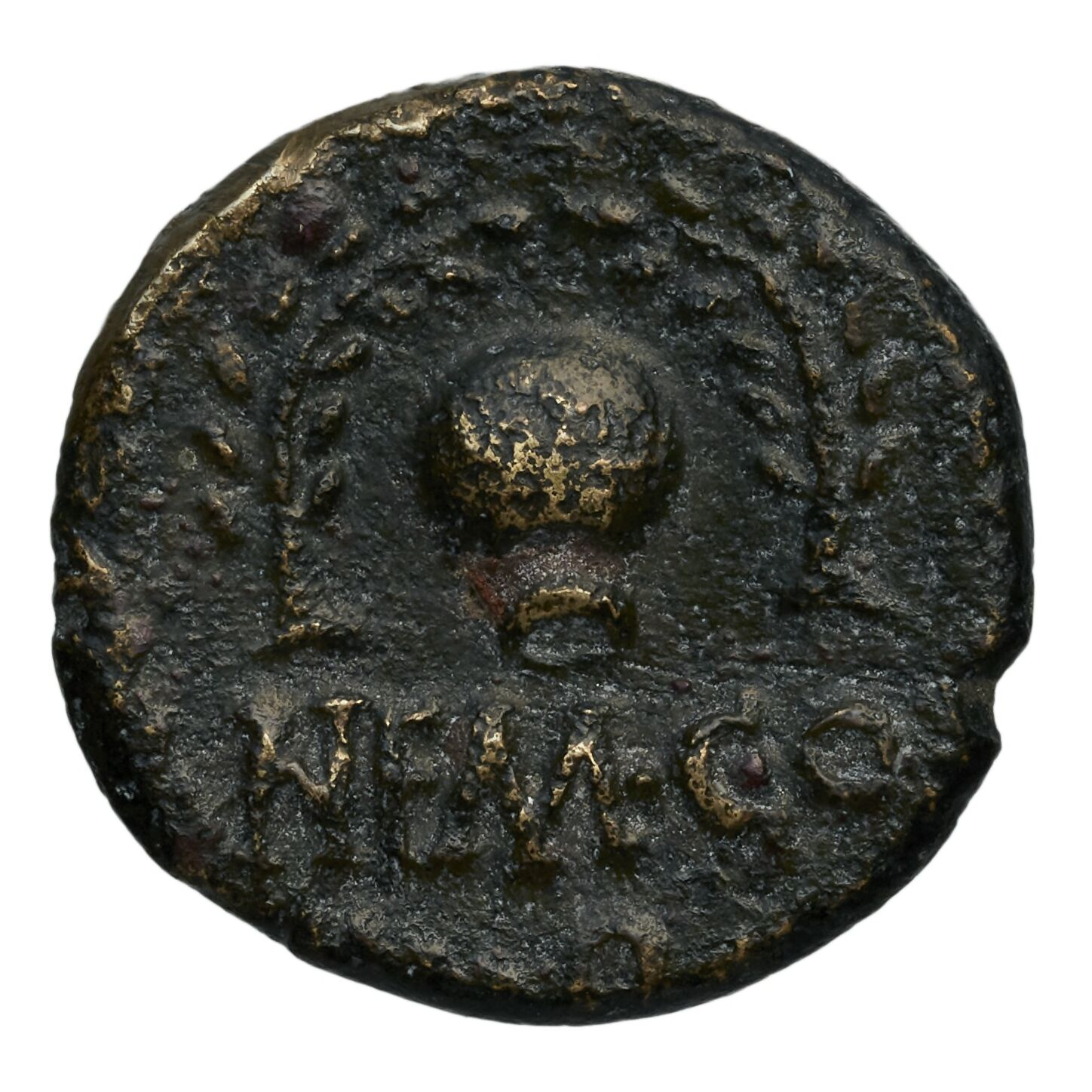
Bronze coin of the colony of Nemausus with a bottoms-up urn

Among the acts establishing Nemausus as the city's chief deity was the building of a horologium that placed him "at the center of civic time". An inscription (Note: CIL XII.3100: Deo Nem[auso] / [Se]x(tus) Utullius / Perseus / horologium / et cerulas II / argenteas / t(estamento) p(osuit).) of unknown date states that as the result of a bequest, in honor of the god Nemausus, a Titullius or Utullius Perseus set up a horologium — perhaps a sundial or, given Nemausus's role as a fountain god, more likely a clepsydra (water clock) — with two cerulae argenteae, objects that have eluded firm identification.

Cerula is an uncommon word that is usually taken to refer to a candelabrum. (Note: Devic and Vaissete note cerula as equivalent to ceriolaria (p. 763) and reference Forcellini's Lexicon. Forcellini defines cerula as a small piece of wax, mentioned in one of Cicero's letters to Atticus; the Oxford Latin Dictionary gives this inscription as its sole example for cerula.) The purpose of candlelight in relation to either a sundial or water clock remains obscure. In the 18th century, the French historian Léon Ménard, who for a time lived in and extensively wrote about Nîmes, read cerulae as gerulae, "bearers", perhaps architectural consoles for the structure. (Note: In Roman inscriptions written in capital letters, C and G are often not distinguishable. Read as C, cerula is derived from cera, "wax" and hence candles. In classical Latin, gerulus/gerula means "carrier, bearer" (related to the verb gero, "bear, carry") but typically refers to humans, distinguished by their gender as masculine or feminine. Lewis and Short's Latin dictionary, which includes examples later than the OLD's 200 CE cut-off point, offers the neuter gerulum from Solinus (first half of the 3rd century).) Since these are described as silver (argenteae), a metal not favored for outdoor architecture, the candelabra may be an entirely separate gift from the horologium. The Swedish art collector and antiquarian Nils Fredrik Sander suggested alternatively that the argenteae might be a pair of silver vessels ornamented with "cerulean" stones or enamel, a Latin color word that describes the blue of the sky or a body of water reflecting it, hence suited for a dedication to a water god.

The inscription was transcribed in Nîmes by the antiquarian Poldo d'Albenas in the 16th century. It was lost for a time, rediscovered in a house in the Place aux Herbes, Grenoble, and again lost, leaving subsequent conjectures or alternate readings dependent on early transcriptions.

== Inscriptions and functions ==
An important healing-spring sanctuary existed at Nîmes at the site of the Jardins de la Fontaine. Nearly all the 70 inscriptions from Nîmes marking religious dedications come from this central sanctuary, and five were uncovered in the basin of the spring during the rebuilding of the 1700s. Among these Nemausus is the recipient most often named, (Note: CIL XII.3070, 3072, 3093–3102, 3132.) appearing in 14 inscriptions. Nemausus may have been conceived as an embodiment of the spring's power to ward off harm or ills and hence a guardian of the site, comparable to Fons at Rome or the so-called "male gorgon" at Bath. All the inscriptions to deus Nemausus have been found within Nîmes, with the exception of a votive made on behalf of the dedicand's father at nearby Manduel, (Note: CIL XII.3097) where Diana received offerings as a moon goddess.

=== Matres nemausicae ===
A Gallo-Greek dedication matrebo namausikabo, "to the Nemausican mothers", would have been a local expression of the widespread Celtic cult of the Mothers (Matres). In the masculine form, the theonym Nemausus is always singular; in the plural, feminine.

=== Group altar ===
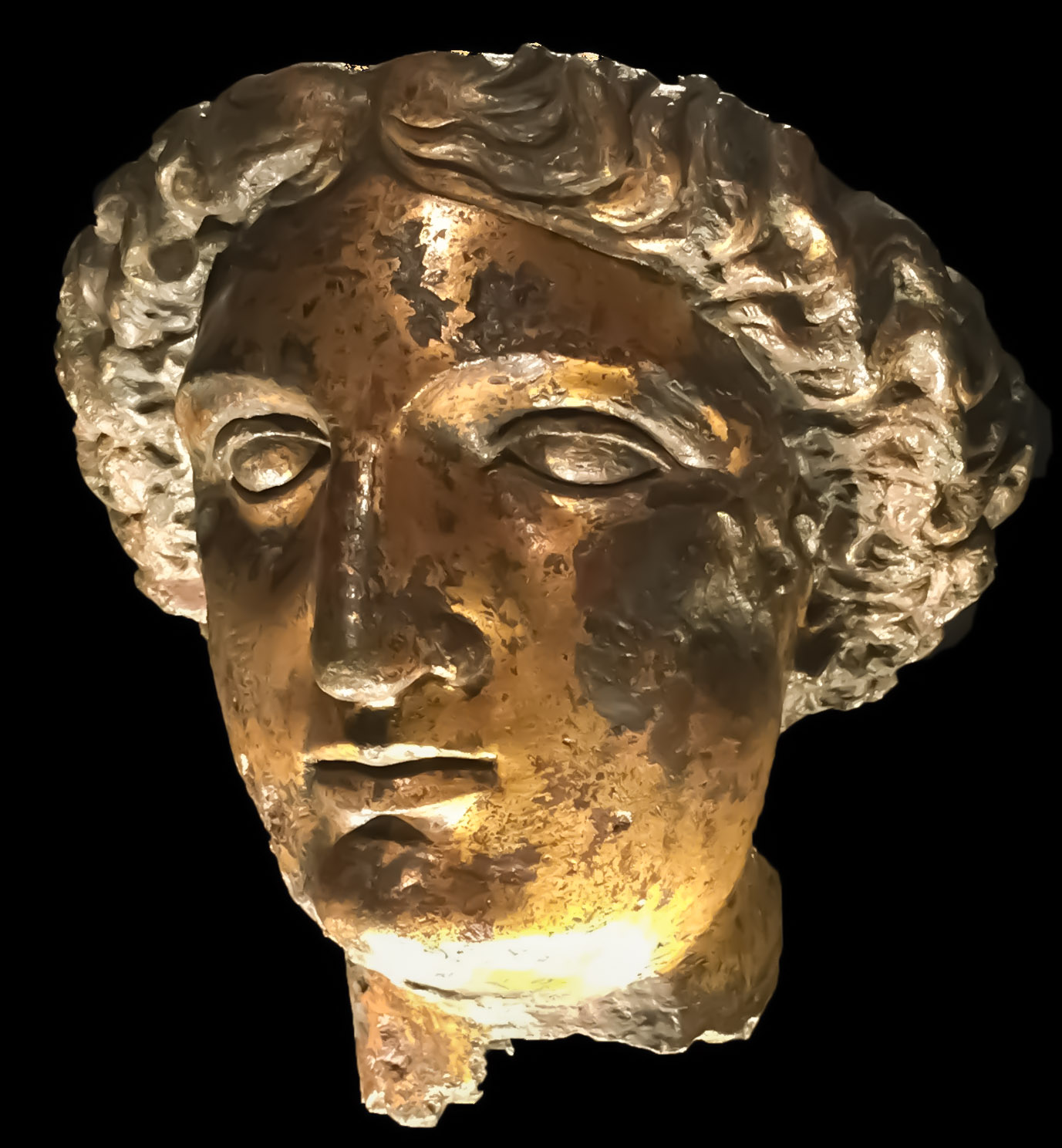
Head of Minerva Sulis from Bath, where the Roman goddess also was integrated into a preexisting water cult

An inscription (see under "Name" above) marking the renovation of a large altar places Nemausus in the company of the imperial Lares Augusti and Minerva, one of the most important Roman goddesses, along with two obscure deities, Urnia and Avicantus. The four individual deities may be intended as divine couples, in which case Nemausus is ranked highly enough to be paired with Minerva.

Urnia and Avicantus are assumed to be water deities; in question is which streams they represent. Urnia is most likely the Fontaine d'Eure near Uzès, (Note: Not to be confused with the distant but much larger and better-known Eure river in Normandy.) the major source of water for the famous Pont du Gard aqueduct built in the 1st century CE by the Romans to support the burgeoning population of Nîmes; the lesser stream Ourne, near Anduze, has been proposed as well. Urnia is probably to be related to an inscription set up by the cultores Urae fontis (caretakers of the spring of Ura) near the nymphaeum at Uzès, ancient Ucetia.

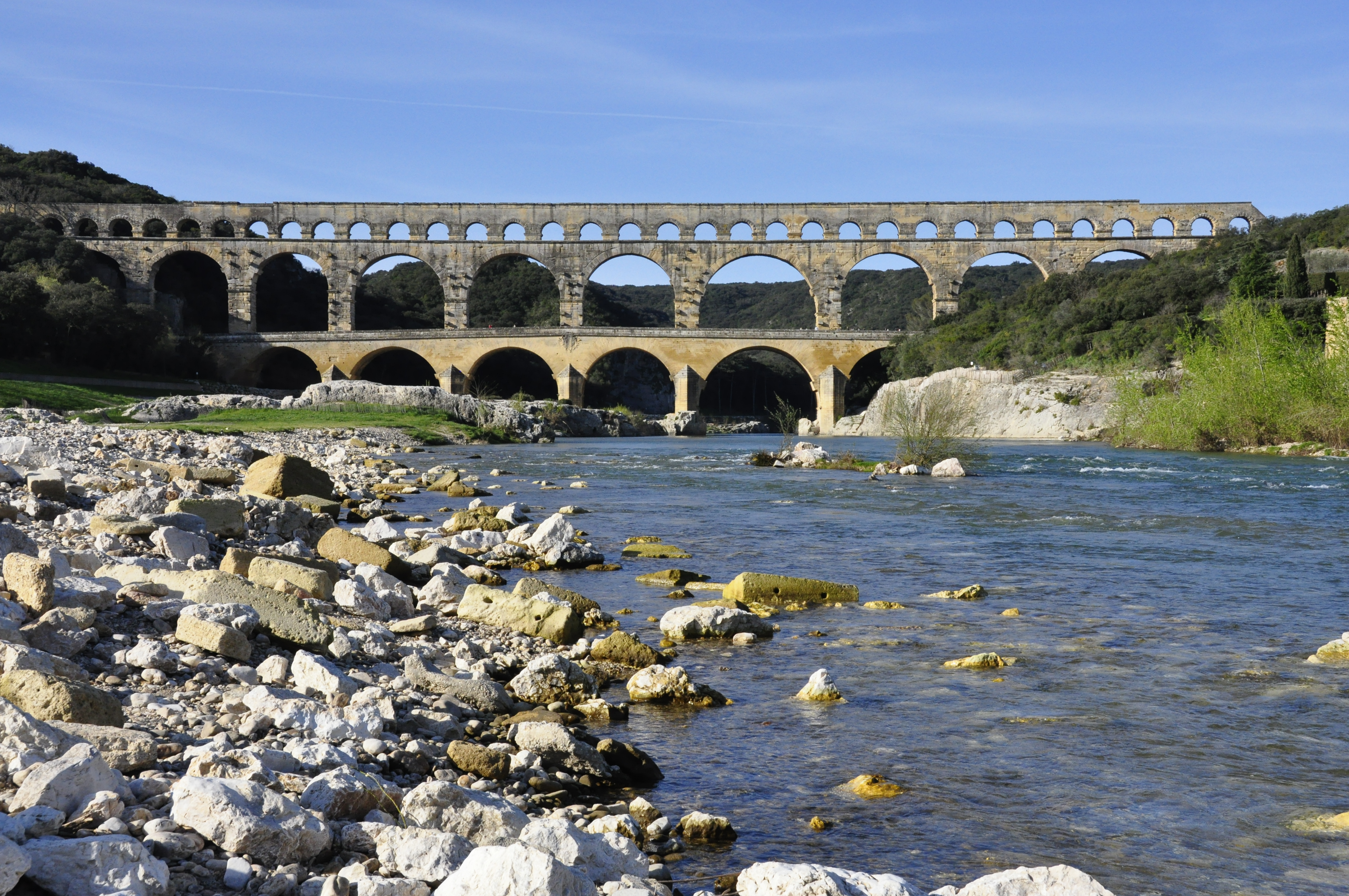
Pont du Gard spanning the Gardon in 2011

The construction of the Pont du Gard had a major impact on hydrology and the environment along the aqueduct's length (50 km/31 mi); dedications particularly to water deities may be efforts to compensate for interfering with divine provinces. At present-day Lédenon, a community situated less than five miles from the Pont du Gard but more than twice that distance from Nîmes, people who described themselves as Nemausenses (Nîmois or Nîmoises (Note: In Latin, Nemausenses is a third-declension plural, and in the absence of gendered modifiers can be either masculine or feminine.), residents of Nîmes) set up a rather informal dedication (Note: CIL XII 2990: Letinnoni b(onae) opif(erae) imperi(io) poni Nemausenses.) to the "good and bountiful" Letinno, an otherwise unknown deity who may have been a lake diverted and drained for the waterworks.

While Avianus (or Abianos) is a common name for gods of water in southern Gaul, no particular place in the area around Nîmes suggests itself as "Avicantus" — possibly the Vistre river or the rural town of La Vigan. Delamarre offers a tentative analysis of the name Avicantus as an inclination or will toward "a hundred desires".

=== Nemausus and imperial cult ===
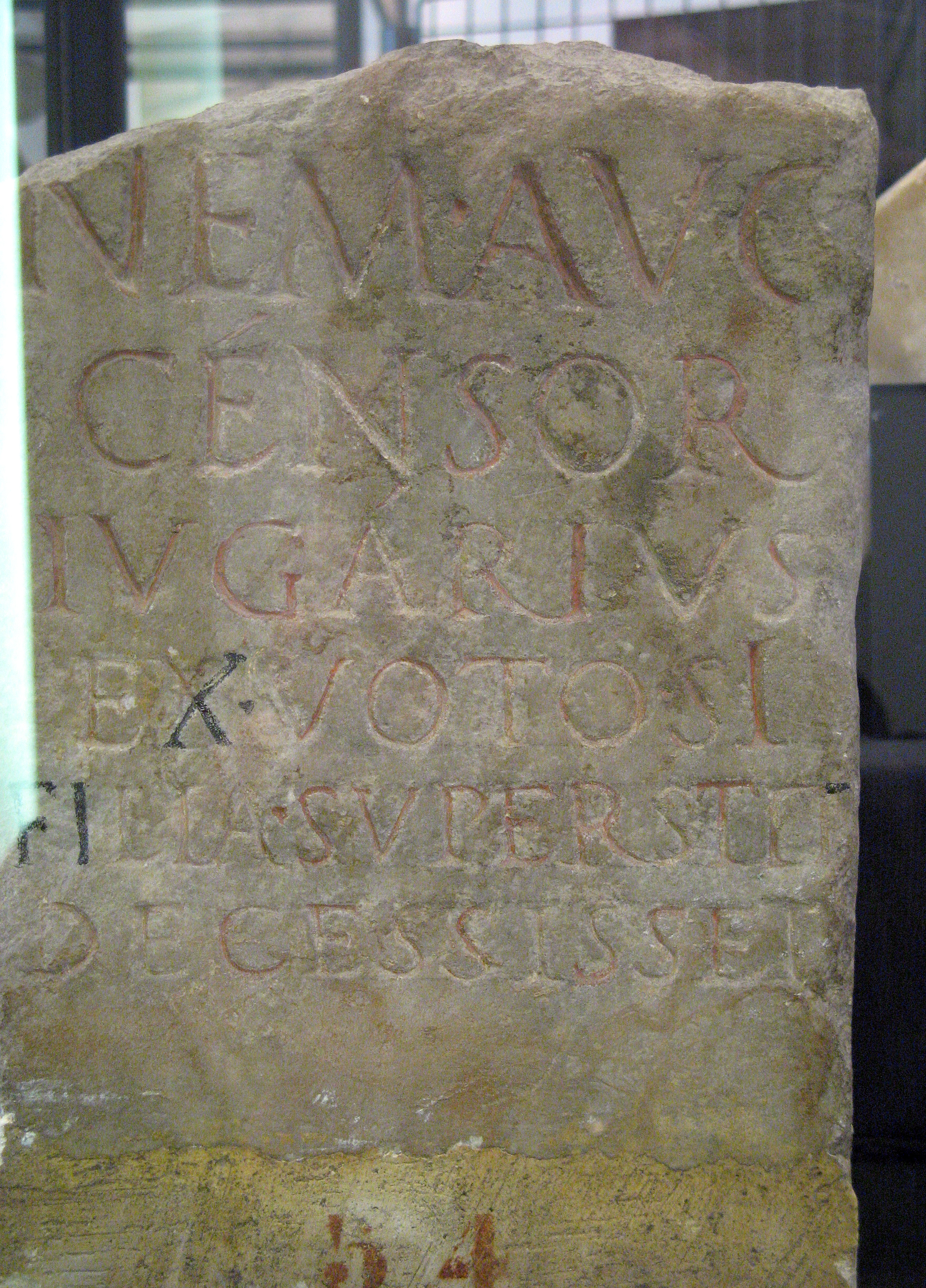
A votive inscription to Nemausus Augustus (CIL XII.3102) at the Musée de la Romanité in Nîmes

Established in some form perhaps in the early Iron Age or certainly by the 2nd century BC, the sanctuary was enlarged and rebuilt under Roman rule, and Nîmes was especially favored by Augustus. In addition to the association of Nemausus with the Lares Augusti of Roman imperial cult in the group inscription, two inscriptions grant Nemausus himself the epithet augustus.

Augustan revivalism in matters of Roman state religion is evidenced also at Nîmes by two inscriptions (Note: CIL XII.3183, 3184.) marking local participation in the Lupercalia, an archaic Roman festival and unexpected export to the provinces because of its rootedness in the specific topography of Rome. The participants were members of the equestrian order. Roman deities who received offerings within the sanctuary include Apollo, Diana, Jupiter, Liber, Minerva, Silvanus, and Victoria, along with two deities from the Roman East, Isis and Baal-Hadad as Jupiter Heliopolitanus. The sacral aura of the preexisting site was thus appropriated for the administration of imperial cult through investment in building construction and the cultivation of deities with Roman names.

Dedications in honor of the emperor or Roman priests (flamines) at the sanctuary are made in connection with the spring. In another indication of integration with imperial cult, the emperor Hadrian commemorated the divinized Plotina, who is thought to have been born at Nîmes, at the sanctuary.

=== Nemausus and Jupiter Heliopoitanus ===
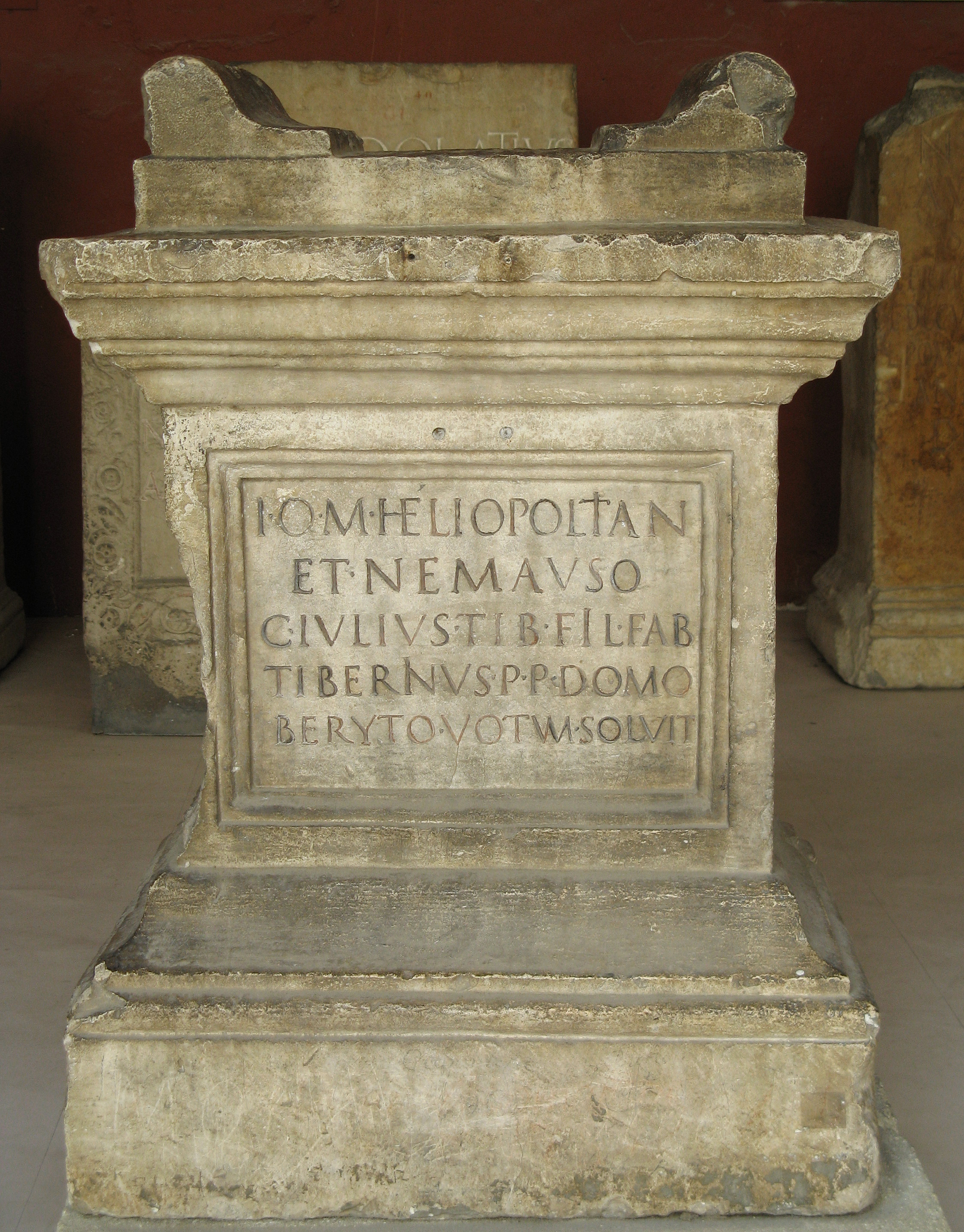
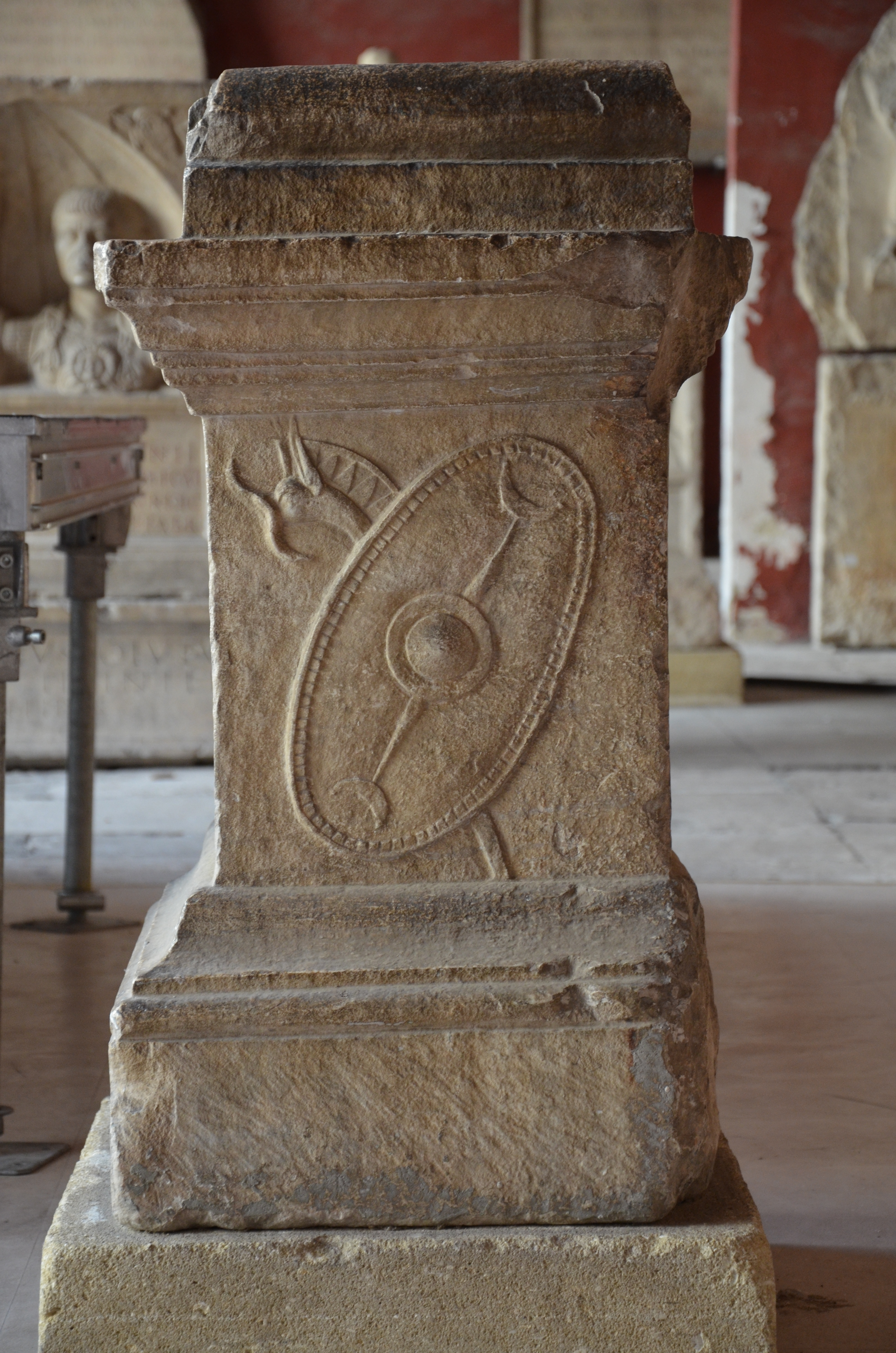
Inscription on the votive altar (2nd–3rd century CE) dedicated jointly to Jupiter Heliopolitanus and Nemausus; on another side, two symbols of Gallic military service, a carnyx crossed with a Celtic shield

The most unusual inscription naming Nemausus appears on an altar dedicated to him and Iupiter Optimus Maximus Heliopolitanus jointly by Gaius Julius Tiberinus. Jupiter Heliopolitanus is a Roman syncretization of Jupiter with Baal-Hadad originating in what is today Lebanon, and Tiberinus identifies himself as a primipilaris domo Beryto, a former first-rank centurion whose home was in, or who possibly was based in, Berytus, ancient Beirut. He was likely a veteran, either settled as part of the colonial project in Nîmes or a native of Nîmes.

Heliopolitanus is given precedence in the inscription and is pictured in relief on one side of the altar. The opposite side shows a typically oblong Gallic shield, the vertical axis of which crosses with a carnyx underneath. These military symbols appear in Gallic art and coins, but are also appropriated widely on Roman coins and triumphal art as spoils of war signaling the defeat of the Gauls. That message, however, seems out of place in a city that had been loyal to Rome since 121 BC, setting aside some turmoil involving Massalia (Greek Marseille) and Pompeius, with southern Gaul as a whole staunchly backing Julius Caesar during the Gallic Wars and then favored by Augustus. The shield and carnyx seem rather to be affirmations of the strength of Nemausus, lending him some characteristics of Mars as a guardian. Unlike deities who were merged with a Roman god by appending their Celtic name (such as Mars Camulus et al.), Nemausus as a specific god of place, like a genius loci, is never explicitly romanized with an epithet in the extant inscriptions.

== Sources ==
- Amandry, Michel; Christol, Michel (1996). Nîmes. Carte archéologique de la Gaule.
- Barry, M. E. (1872). "Les origines et les premiers temps de la ville de Nîmes". Mémoires de l'Académie des sciences, inscriptions et belles-lettres de Toulouse. 4: 193–259.
- Bellatore, André (2003). "Un grand plan de mur rose: notes sur Pour un Malherbe de Francis Ponge". Rhétoriques méditerranéennes. 7: 256–266. doi:10.4000/babel.1419.
- Christol, Michel; Goudineau, Christian (1988). "Nîmes et les Volques Arécomiques au Ier siècle avant J.-C". Gallia. 45: 87–103.
- Christol, Michel (2016). "Jupiter Héliopolitain et Nemausus sur l'autel d'un citoyen de Beyrouth à la Fontaine de Nîmes: La terre des ancêstre et son dieu éponyme". Cahiers du Centre Gustave Glotz. 27: 27–52. JSTOR 44945899.
- Delamarre, Xavier (2003). Dictionnaire de la langue gauloise (2nd ed.). Errance.
- Devic, Claude; Vaissete, Joseph (1872). Histoire générale de Languedoc: Recueil des inscriptions antiques. Vol. 15. Édouard Privat.
- Green, Miranda J. (1997). Dictionary of Celtic Myth and Legend. Thames and Hudson.
- Häussler, Ralph [as Haeussler] (2011). "Beyond 'Polis Religion' and Sacerdotes Publici in Southern Gaul". In Richardson, James H.; Santangelo, Federico (eds.). Priests and State in the Roman World. Potsdamer Altertumswissenschaftliche Beiträge. Vol. 30. Franz Steiner. pp. 391–428.
- Häussler, Ralph (2020). "Remembering and Inventing: The Dynamic Rewriting of Sacred Landscapes in the Colonia Nemausus". In Häussler, Ralph; Chiai, Gian Franco (eds.). Sacred Landscape in Antiquity: Creation, Manipulation, Transformation. Oxbow. pp. 403–418.
- Johnston, Andrew C. (2017). The Sons of Remus: Identity in Roman Gaul and Spain. Harvard University Press.
- Lejeune, Michel (1994). "Nîmes préromaine: cultes indigènes". Revue de l'histoire des religions. 211 (1): 5–14. JSTOR 23671441.
- Longfellow, Brenda (2012). "Roman Fountains in Greek Sanctuaries". American Journal of Archaeology. 116 (1): 133–155. JSTOR 10.3764/aja.116.1.0133.
- Moret, Pierre (2022). "Tolosa Tectosagum: A Wide-Ranging Connectivity Hub between Transalpine Gaul, Aquitania and Hispania Citerior". In Ñaco del Hoyo, Toni; Principal, Jordi; Dobson, Mike (eds.). Rome and the North-Western Mediterranean: Integration and Connectivity c. 150–70 BC. Oxbow. pp. 121–130.
- Ménard, Léon (1758). Histoire civile, eccclésiastique, et litteraire de la Ville de Nismes. Vol. 7. Chaubert-Herissant.
- Richmond, I. A.; Toynbee, J. M. C. (1955). "The Temple of Sulis-Minerva at Bath". Journal of Roman Studies. 45: 97–105. JSTOR 298749.
- Rivet, A. L. F. (1988). Gallia Narbonensis: Southern France in Roman Times. Batsford.
- Sander, Frédéric [Nils Fredrik Sander] (1892). La mythologie du Nord éclairée par des inscriptions latines en Germanie, en Gaule et dans la Bretagne ancienne des premiers siècles de notre ère. Nationalmuseum of Stockholm.
