= Aquae Sulis =

Town in Roman Britain on the site of Bath, England

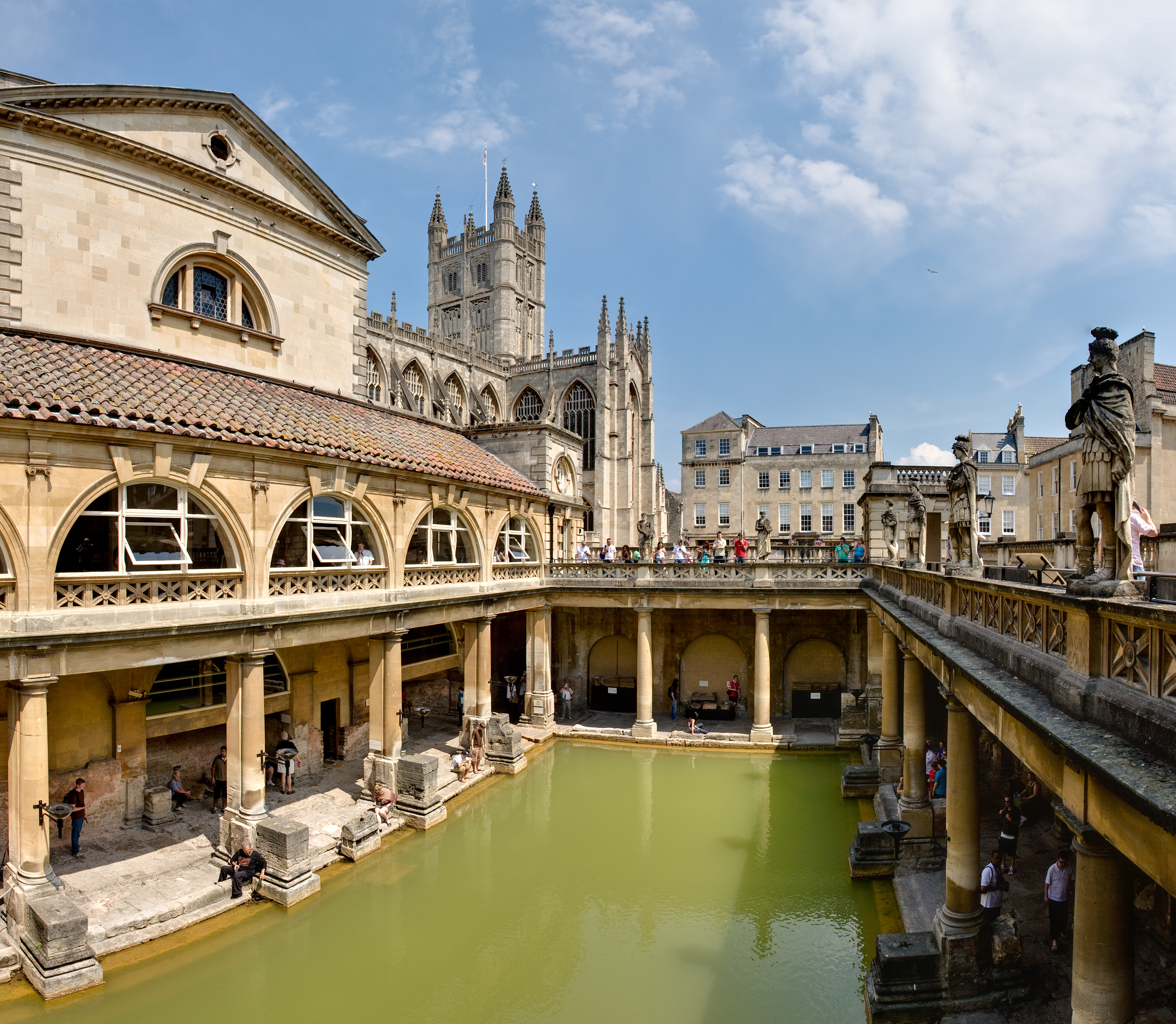
The Great Bath. The Roman bath itself is substantially intact but everything above the level of the pillar bases is of a later date.

Aquae Sulis (Latin for Waters of Sulis) (now the city of Bath, Somerset) was a small town in the Roman province of Britannia, established in the first few years after the Romans arrived in Britain. It is situated where the Fosse Way crosses the River Avon, in an area of naturally occurring hot springs. The settlement had developed into an important walled temple and bath complex by the 3rd century AD, and appears to have served as a visitor attraction before falling into disrepair and eventual decline by the start of the 5th century. The Antonine Itinerary register of Roman roads lists the town as Aquis Sulis. Ptolemy records the town as Aquae calidae (warm waters) in his 2nd-century work Geographia, where it is listed as one of the cities of the Belgae.

The Roman town walls were retained by later inhabitants, and within them a monastery was established in the 7th century, developing to become Bath Abbey. The Roman Baths, long flooded and silted up, were being improved and developed for visitors in Elizabethan times, along with the grant of a city charter. By the 18th century Bath led the field in the fashion for bathing and spa resorts and the 'King's Bath' was given a Georgian makeover. By the 1900s the Great Bath itself had been discovered, excavated and given a neo-classical superstructure. The city's Georgian architecture, combined with the impressive Roman remains and visitor complex, has resulted in Bath becoming one of Britain's major tourist destinations. It was declared a UNESCO World Heritage Site in 1986, and is included in a second such designation as one of the eleven 'Great Spa Towns of Europe'.

== Development ==
=== Baths and temple complex ===
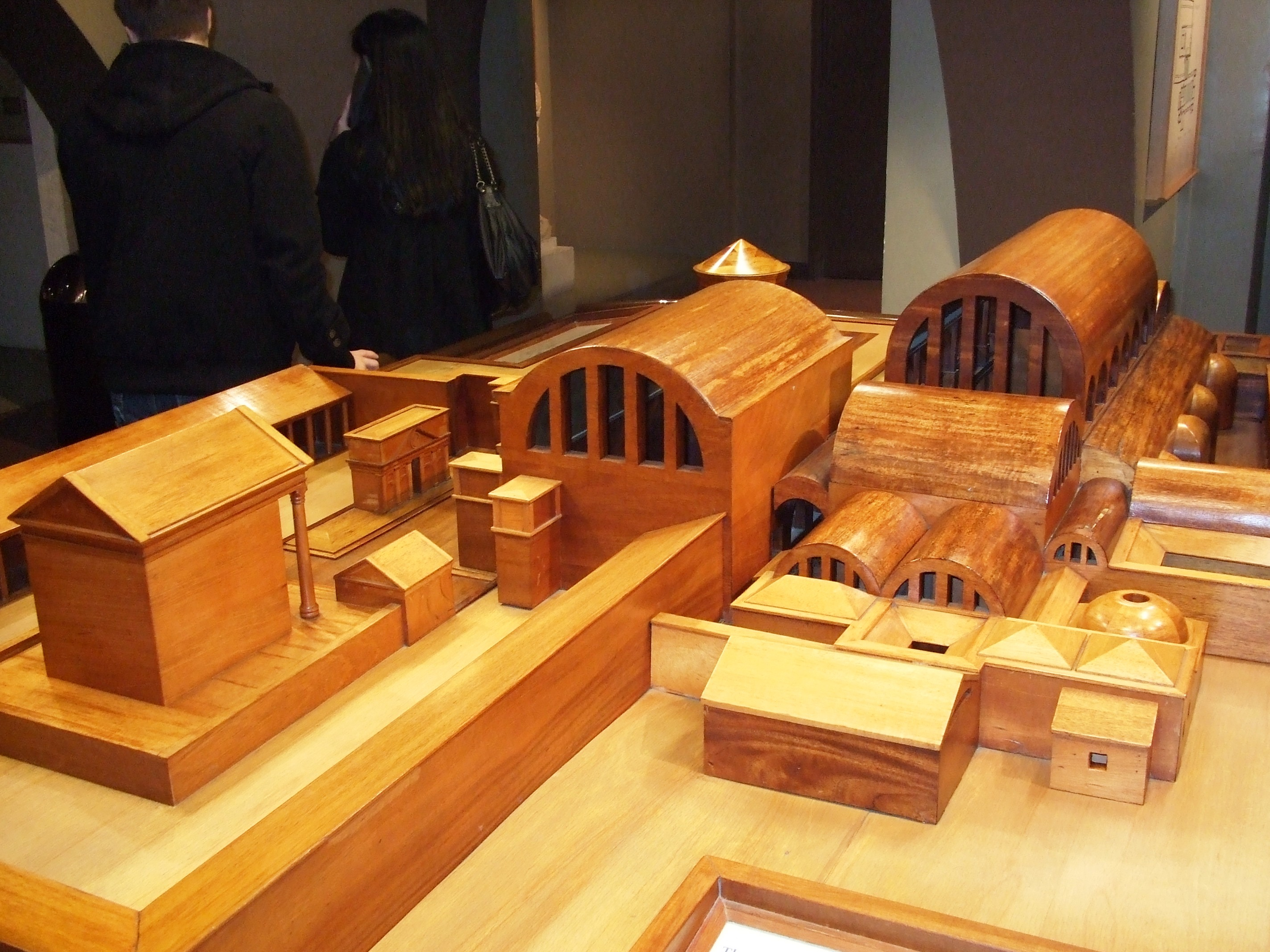
Model of the Roman baths and temple complex

Groundplan of the Temple complex walls, Roman Roads and areas of housing at Aquae Sulis, over a modern map of Bath.

The Romans probably began building a formal temple complex at Aquae Sulis in the AD 60s. The Romans had probably arrived in the area shortly after their arrival in Britain in AD 43 and there is evidence that their military road, the Fosse Way, crossed the River Avon at Bath. An early Roman military presence has been found just to the north-east of the bath complex in the Walcot area of modern Bath. Not far from the crossing point of their road, they would have been attracted by the large natural hot spring which had been a shrine of the Celtic Brythons, dedicated to their goddess Sulis. This spring is a natural mineral spring found; it is the only spring in Britain officially designated as hot. The name is Latin for "the waters of Sulis". The Romans identified the goddess with their goddess Minerva and encouraged her worship. The similarities between Minerva and Sulis helped the Celts adapt to Roman culture. The spring was built up into a major Roman Baths complex associated with an adjoining temple. About 130 messages to Sulis scratched onto lead curse tablets (defixiones) have been recovered from the Sacred Spring by archaeologists. Most of them were written in Latin, although one discovered was in Brythonic; they usually laid curses upon those whom the writer felt had done them wrong. This collection is the most important found in Britain.

The Brythonic curse recovered on a metal pendant is the only sentence in the language that has been discovered. It reads:

Adixoui Deuina Deieda Andagin Uindiorix cuamenai or maybe Adixoui Deiana Deieda Andagin Uindiorix cuamiun ai

The affixed – Deuina, Deieda, Andagin, (and) Uindiorix – I have bound

An alternative translation based on a translation of certain words as non-proper nouns is the following:

May I, Windiorix for/at Cuamena defeat (alt. summon to justice) the worthless woman, oh divine Deieda.

(Alt. Divine Deiada, may I, Windiorix, bring to justice/defeat (in court) the woman at Cuamena.)

This is still an uncertain translation in that it takes into account the nominal cases of the nouns:

Windiorix (alt. Windorix) - nominative masculine (subject), lit. "fair-headed" (windo) "king" (rix); Dewina Deieda - nominative/vocative feminine "divine Deieda" (deiada "goddess"); Andagin - accusative feminine "woman"; Cuamenai - locative/dative feminine of Cuamena

Gaius Julius Solinus remarks "The circumference of Britain is 4875 miles. In this space are many great rivers, and hot springs refined with opulent splendour for the use of mortal men. Minerva is the patroness of these springs. In her shrine, the perpetual fires never whiten into ashes. When they dwindle away, they change into stony globules."

=== Walled town ===
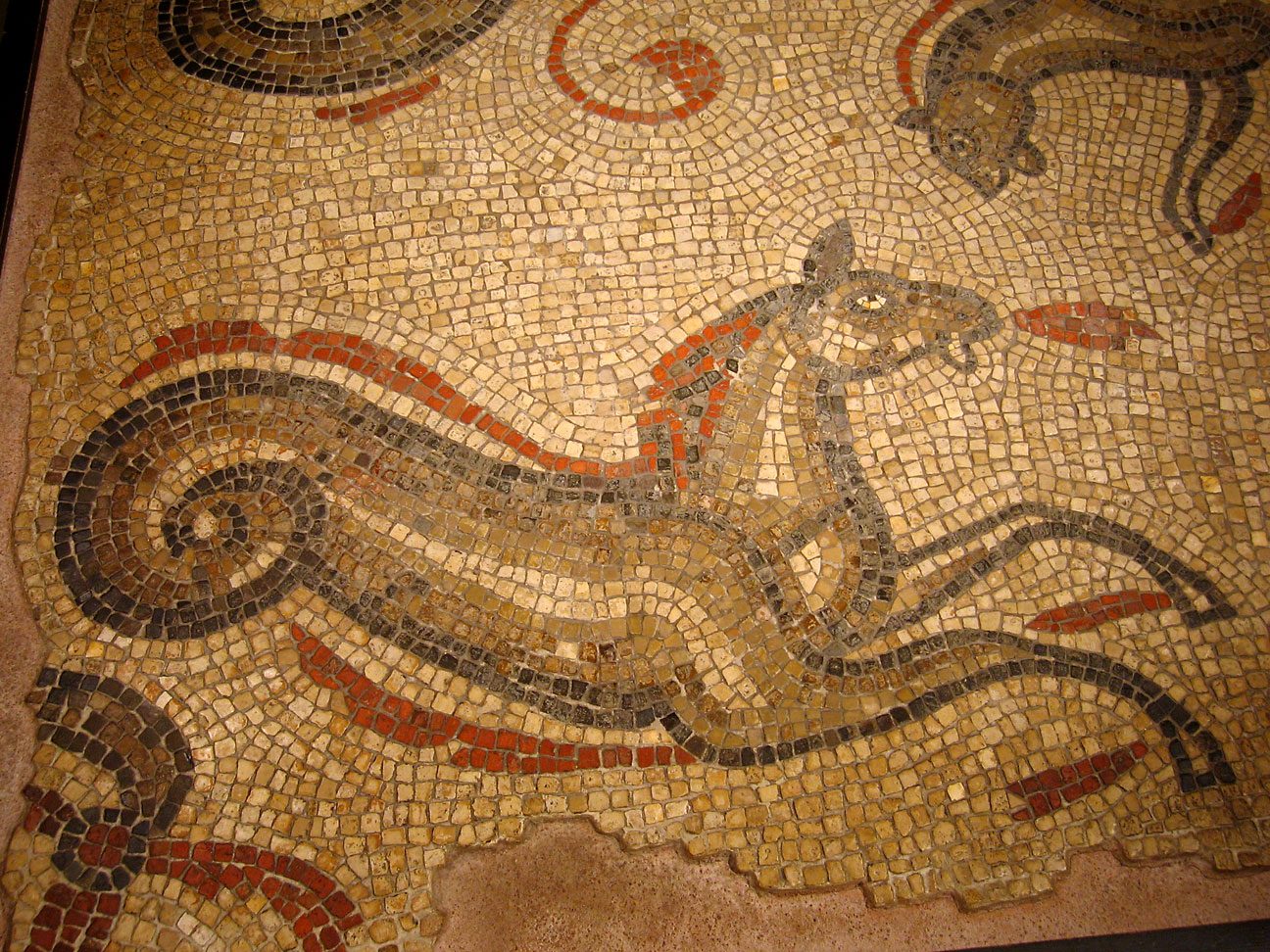
Hippocamp, the main figure in a section of mosaic floor from the Roman Baths

It was the religious settlement, rather than the road junction further north and the residential area now known as Walcot, which was given defensive stone walls, probably in the 3rd century. The area within – of approximately 23 acres (9.3 ha) – was largely open ground, but soon began to be filled in. There is some dispute as to whether these new buildings were private dwellings or were associated with servicing the pilgrims to the temple. There was also a ribbon development along the northern road outside the walls and cemeteries beyond.

=== Decline ===
From the later 3rd century on, the Western Roman Empire and its urban life declined. The great suite of baths fell into disrepair, but some use of the hot springs continued. After the end of Roman rule in Britain around AD 410, some residents seem to have remained, but violence appears to have taken root. Archaeological evidence of chaos and piratical raids on the few citizens who remained resident in the 440s include the finding of a young girl's severed head in an oven in Abbeygate Street during excavations in 1984–1985.

As far back as Geoffrey of Monmouth, the Arthurian Battle of Mons Badonicus (c. 500) has been suggested to have taken place near Aquae Sulis. Tim and Annette Burkitt have proposed Caer Badden (Latin: Aquae Sulis), about 20 mi (32 km) north-east of the Roman mines at Charterhouse, on the basis of the Welsh Annals, as well as archaeological and toponymic evidence.

== Medieval legend ==
In medieval times, the Roman temple at Bath was incorporated into British legend. The thermal springs at Bath were said to have been dedicated to Minerva by the legendary King Bladud and the temple there endowed with an eternal flame.

An 8th century poem in Old English, The Ruin, describing the ruinous changes that had overtaken a Roman hot-water spring, is assumed to be a reference to Aquae Sulis. The poem was copied in the Exeter Book for transmission to future generations.

== Rediscovery ==
A 3rd century writer, Gaius Julius Solinus, described a British hot spring with Minerva's temple, which gave subsequent historians such as Geoffrey of Monmouth access to that knowledge, which they understood to relate to Bath. On the ground, however, late Roman Aquae Sulis experienced a decline, presumably related to the shift to Christianity and away from the old temples. In the centuries following the withdrawal of the Roman legions in 410 AD the decay and collapse of the buildings and baths continued. Over the centuries that followed, several metres of accumulated material buried the Roman occupation layers. The Great Bath became completely silted up and seemingly vanished from memory. It is unknown if the town was completely abandoned. It may well have remained in use, but the inhabitants left few physical remains.

=== Saxons and Normans ===
An 8th century poem called The Ruin describes the decayed Roman city and the hot springs, but is ambiguous both on the state of any standing buildings and of any continuous occupation. The trend was reversed from the 7th century with the arrival of a monastic community. The town was also a noted administrative centre by the 9th Century when, as part of Alfred the Great's Wessex Kingdom, it was laid out as a Burh, within the old Roman walls. By the time of the Norman Domesday Survey of 1086 Bath was the largest town in Somerset, with a thriving monastery, a mint and market and 178 burgesses. With the installation of the Norman Bishop John of Tours to the diocese, the Cathedral was transferred from Wells to Bath, and around 1090 he began construction of a huge new Cathedral Church serving both the Abbey and the town, within its own precinct occupying the southeastern quarter of the walled town. Bishop John also took great interest in the hot springs, and constructed, over the site of the Roman sacred spring itself, a new bathing pool that came to known as the King's Bath. Some of the 12th century stone arches were built directly onto the Roman reservoir walls on the north and east sides of the pool indicating considerable awareness of the earlier structures.

=== Antiquarians ===
In the early 16th century John Leland visited Bath as part of his tour of England, recording antiquarian objects. He recorded a number of inscriptions from Roman grave markers, and this set the pattern for those that followed, notably William Camden. Camden's Brittanica of 1586, with additions in succeeding centuries, provided an accessible record of Bath's monuments and stones, especially after it was translated from Latin to English in 1789. A spur to knowledge of Bath's past came from Oliver King, Bishop of Bath and Wells. Despite the Cathedral functions progressively moving back to Wells, in 1499 King initiated a complete rebuilding of Bath Abbey Church. Smaller than the decaying Norman Cathedral, it remains an extravagantly impressive structure, close by the Roman baths and repurposed as the town's Parish Church. The Dissolution of the Monasteries was another catalyst for redevelopment works within the old Abbey precinct, and through all these works many Roman artifacts came to light to be recorded by the antiquarians. The 'Queen's Bath' was built above the Roman 'Circular Bath', and 'Cross Bath' and other smaller baths were developed during Elizabethan and later periods as places of healing as part of the redefining of the medieval hospitals. These disparate processes all worked to bring a greater consciousness of Bath's Roman past. In the 17th and 18th centuries antiquarians such as William Musgrave and William Stukeley took an interest in Bath, publishing carefully drawn descriptions of new finds, and records of various Roman cemeteries, which set a trend for local antiquarian study and recording.

=== Builders ===
The biggest feature of 17th and 18th century Bath was the beginning of a vast building programme, led by John Wood senior, a local architect who pioneered the use of local Bath stone for distinctive classical buildings, designed using Palladian architectural principles. With his interest in the classical world, John Wood took considerable interest in the Roman items that came to light during construction of both his own and other building works. Much of the town's Georgian expansion was happening outside the walls, where Roman finds were rare, but the new prosperity of the town was resulting in rebuilding and infrastructure works within the town as well. In 1727 a trench for a new sewer in Stall Street brought to light the gilded head of Minerva, still one of Bath's greatest Roman treasures. Work by Wood on the Mineral Hospital in 1738 recorded Roman buildings. The Duke of Kingstone's baths, built in the late 1750s, revealed the east end of the Roman bathing complex, and steps were discovered that would later be found to belong to the 'Great Bath'. It was, however, the rebuilding of the Grand Pump Room in 1790-3, that unearthed the facade of the Roman Temple, with its Gorgon's head centrepiece. The publicity surrounding this put Aquae Sulis firmly into the wider public consciousness.

The rate of new buildings declined in the first half of the 19th century, but the period is notable for the growth in local and regional antiquarian and archaeology societies, along with the influential Bath Literary and Scientific Institution, founded in 1824. This resulted in a more systematic approach to both recording and preserving items that came to light. In the later 19th century, the activities of several individuals were particularly significant. Fron 1864 to 1871 James Irving was appointed Clerk of Works for the renovation of the Abbey by George Gilbert Scott. Irving's interest in archaeology extended well beyond the works at the Abbey, and he made detailed stratigraphic records at several construction sites across the town, along with archaeological photographs. In 1869 Major C E Davis was appointed city engineer by Bath corporation. He explored the Roman springs beneath the King's Bath. These had been investigated in 1810 by William Smith, the pioneer geologist. The waters had ceased to bubble up, so he opened up the Hot Bath Spring to the bottom, found that the spring had flowed into a new channel and restored the water to its original course. Davis was called in in 1871 to deal with a leak at the King's Bath. This involved pumping it out, revealing both the Roman Spring and also parts of the steps and lead lining of the Great Bath. Enthusiasm for a full excavation grew and in 1878 the corporation acquired the Kingston Bath, allowing more extensive investigation. Public subscription enabled other nearby properties to be bought and demolished, and by 1881 most of the Great Bath had been uncovered. Over the next few years the Roman 'circular bath' was revealed by the removal of the Queen's Bath, with further passages and rooms to the west of that. By 1896 most of the baths complex was excavated and the Great Bath was given its neo-classical structures and statues, built on the Roman foundations and pillar bases and shortly afterwards opened to the public. Davis has been much criticized for his failure to provide good records of his work, and his inattention to the material above the Roman remains. However one of the builders who worked on the site, Richard Mann, did preserve detailed notes and was subsequently commissioned to draw up plans, cross-sections and isometric views of the works up to around 1900.

=== Archaeologists ===
In the 20th century, the task of investigating Bath's past fell progressively to professional archaeologists. In 1923 the Kingston Baths were demolished and W H Knowles, excavating the eastern baths beneath, made some first steps in the complex task of unravelling how the temple and baths complex had evolved during the Roman period. In the 1950s the Spa Committee were keen to present the Roman remains in a more complete form, and asked the Oxford professor Ian Richmond to work on this. When Richmond died in 1965 it fell to Barry Cunliffe to continue this task, as head of the recently formed 'Bath Excavation Committee'.

In 1972 the Bath Archaeological Trust was established, again headed by Barry Cunliffe until 1982 when Peter Davenport took over. During the early 1980s a significant task was to expand the Roman Baths Museum by uncovering and incorporating the Temple Courtyard, which is some 4 metres (13 ft) below the current pavements of Stall Street. It can now be viewed from a walkway over the Roman remains. This had the major benefit of giving a new focus of interest as part of the whole visitor complex. Many of the long-discovered items could now be displayed in the temple area, along with the rapidly growing number of new discoveries being deposited with the Museum. The city was inscribed as a World Heritage Site in 1987, in part from its ancient Roman history and remains. In the late 1980s the Baths completed a transition from being primarily a council-run visitor attraction to being a Registered Museum, and in 2004 an Accredited Museum. In 1999 it was recognised as having a collection of national significance, and in 2014 its collection of Roman Curse tablets were added to UNESCO's UK Memory of the World Register.

Alongside developments at the baths complex, the 1990s onwards saw a huge increase in developer-led archaeology, required as a condition of planning consent. Until it was dissolved in 2005 the Bath Archaeological Trust was a major component of this work. The Roman settlement outside the walls was given more attention, bringing the suggestion that the settlement at Walcot, which was a bridging point on the Fosse Way, may have predated the more substantial construction around the hot spring a kilometre to the south, with the two foci finally merging together in the 3rd or 4th centuries.

== Remains ==
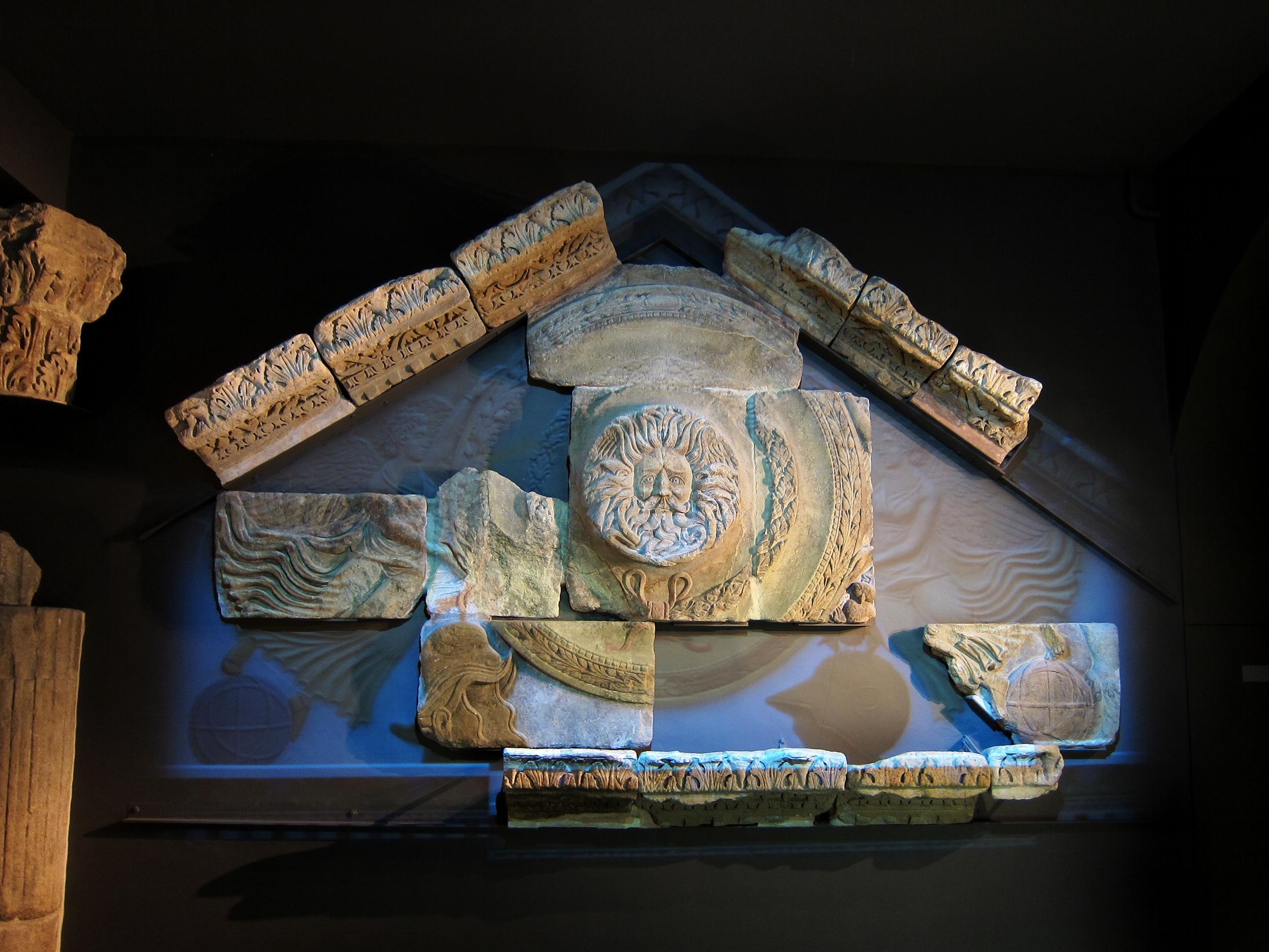
The Gorgon at Roman Baths Museum

Rediscovered from the 18th century onward, the city's Roman remains have become one of Bath's main attractions. They may be viewed almost exclusively at the Roman Baths Museum, which houses:

- Artefacts recovered from the Baths and the Roman town. There is a fine collection of stone sculptures.
- Excavated remains of the main temple courtyard.
- The Roman Baths themselves, though some lie below 18th century stonework. Of particular note is the original Roman Great Bath still lead-lined and fed by the sacred spring through Roman lead pipes.
- A hoard of 30,000 silver coins, one of the largest discovered in Britain, was unearthed in an archaeological dig in 2012. The coins, believed to date from the 3rd century, were found not far away from the Roman baths.

== See also ==
- History of Bath, Somerset
- Timeline of Bath, Somerset
- Roman sites in Great Britain
