= Bath Gorgon =

Stone sculpture in Bath

- Green Man, Latin: Sulis Minerva
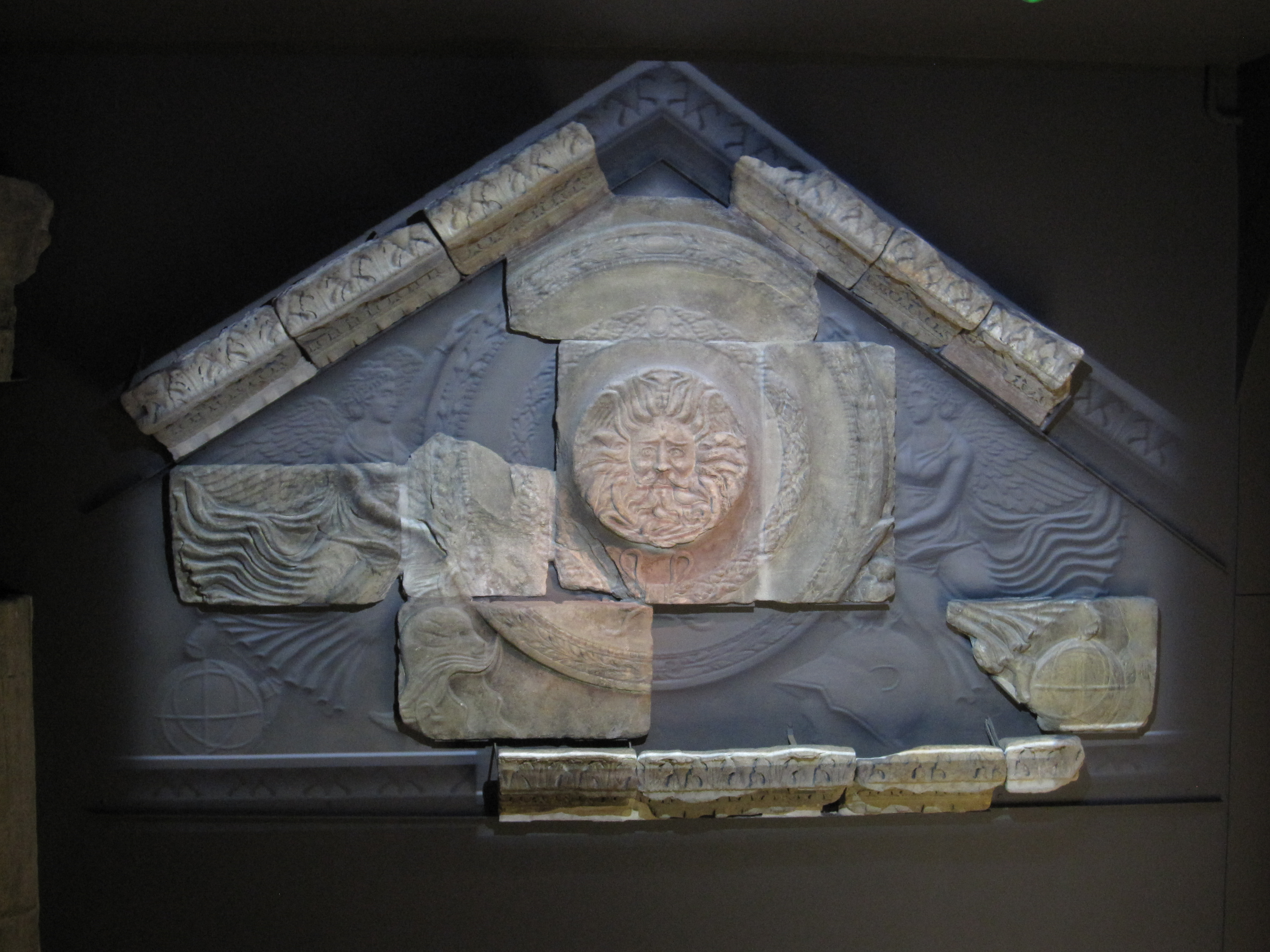
- (Partially restored) Pediment from Temple of Sulis Minerva at Bath
- Year: c. 1st century C.E.
- Medium: stone
- Subject: Gorgon
- Dimensions: 2.4 m × 0.30 m × 7.9 m (8 ft × 1 ft × 26 ft)
- 51.381°N 2.360°W
- Website: www.romanbaths.co.uk/temple-pediment-and-gorgons-head

The Bath Gorgon is a ruined pediment from the Temple of Sulis Minerva, in the Roman Baths in Bath in Somerset, England. The pediment features a Gorgon (or water god)'s head. The figure has been identified as Oceanus, and is sometimes referred to as The Green Man, a Celtic mythological figure.

It was likely carved in the first century CE, by craftsmen from northern Gaul. It was discovered by archaeologists in 1790.

== Sculpture ==
Originally at a height of fifteen metres, the pediment would have been supported by four fluted columns. The pediment was 26 feet (7.9 m) wide and 8 feet (2.4 m) from the apex to the bottom, above the pillars on the front of the building. The Gorgon's head would have been c.15 metres (49 ft) from the ground. There are also several accompanying images on the pediment, such as Tritons (the half-fish and half-men servants to Neptune), a face-helmet shaped like a dolphin's head, a small owl, and female Victories standing on globes.

In early 2010 various stones on the pediment were conserved and rearranged. In 2016, planning permission was received for a new learning centre aimed at schoolchildren and linked to the baths by a tunnel. Funding was sought from the Heritage Lottery Fund, and the centre opened in 2021.

== Interpretations ==
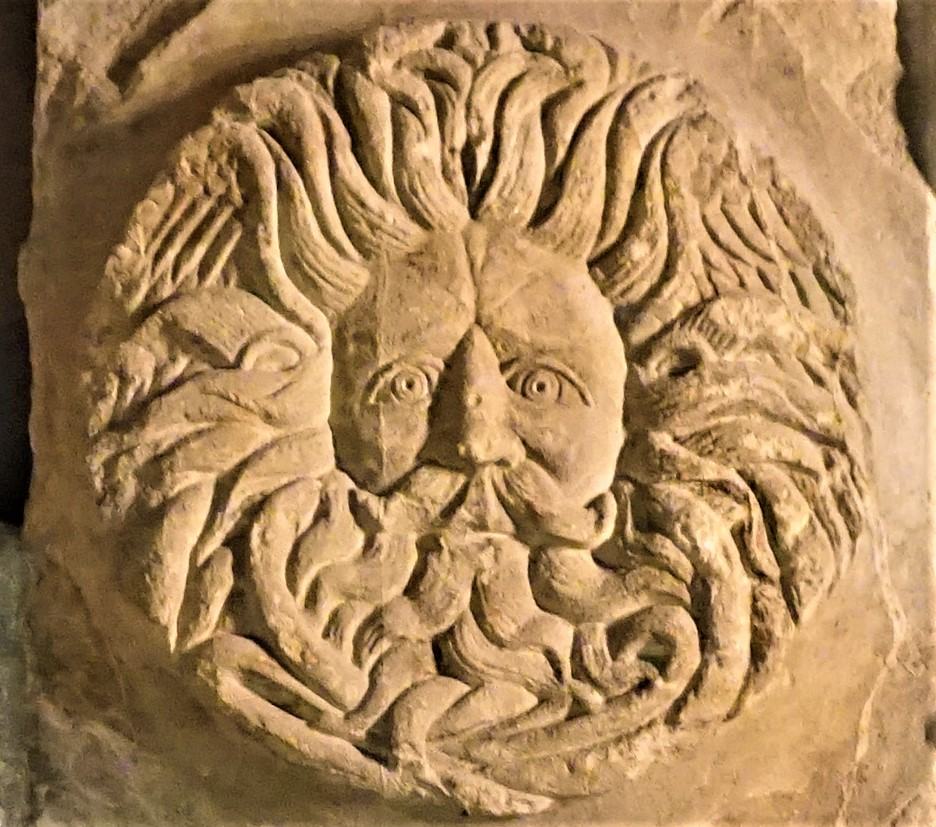
The "Gorgon head" from the Temple pediment

The central figure on the pediment of the Roman Baths (Bath), often referred to as "The Gorgon," has been subject to various interpretations. It has been identified as the sea god Oceanus and sometimes compared to the Green Man, a figure from Celtic mythology.

Some scholars suggest the head represents a local Celtic sun god, while others draw parallels to Roman artistic motifs, such as the Jupiter Ammon clipei found in Roman fora, which sometimes depicted local river gods in Celtic provinces. The name "Gorgon" comes from the Gorgons of Greek mythology, particularly Medusa. According to myth, Perseus slew the Gorgon and presented its severed head to Athena, who placed it on her aegis. This has led the Roman Baths Museum to propose a connection between the pediment's design and the goddess Sulis Minerva, a local deity syncretized with Minerva, the Roman equivalent of Athena.

However, unlike the mythological Gorgon—who is female—the Bath pediment's Gorgon is distinctly male. Some scholars argue this represents a fusion of Celtic and Roman artistic traditions. Others suggest it reflects a water deity, citing similarities to depictions of Oceanus, such as on a silver dish from Mildenhall.

A 2016 study by Eleri H. Cousins identified elements of imperial iconography within the pediment, including the Victories, an oak wreath, and a star at the apex. Cousins also noted similarities between this imagery and architectural features in Gaul and Hispania, arguing that the Forum of Augustus served as a stylistic archetype. She suggested the pediment reflects a fusion of local and empire-wide artistic influences rather than a strictly 'Roman' or 'Celtic' design.

The head itself features snakes entwined within its beard, wings above its ears, prominent brows, and a heavy moustache. While the presence of snakes is characteristic of Gorgon imagery, the figure's masculinity has fueled debate over its precise meaning. The prevailing view among scholars is that the image represents a deliberate syncretism—combining Minerva's Gorgon emblem with the face of a local water deity associated with the sacred spring.

Archaeologist R. G. Collingwood appreciated the meeting of Roman and Celtic art, finding that the sculptor creator was a "skilled artist".
