= Birthday card =

Card given to someone to celebrate their birthday

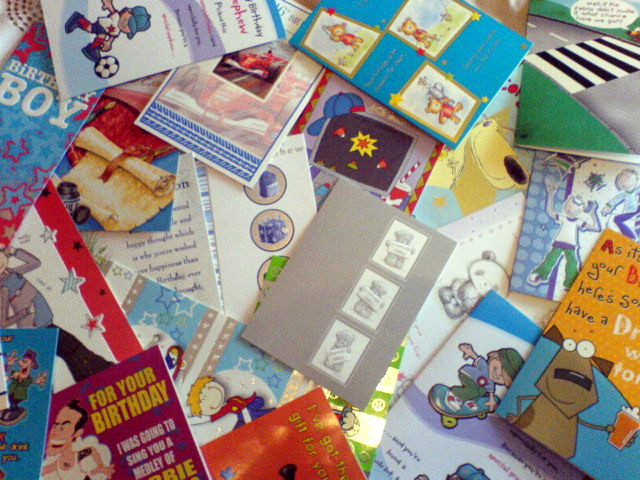
A selection of birthday cards

A birthday card is a greeting card given or sent to a person to celebrate their birthday. Similar to a birthday cake, birthday card traditions vary by culture but the origin of birthday cards is unclear. The advent of computing and introduction of the internet and social media has led to the use of electronic birthday cards or even Facebook posts to send birthday messages.

== Meaning and research ==
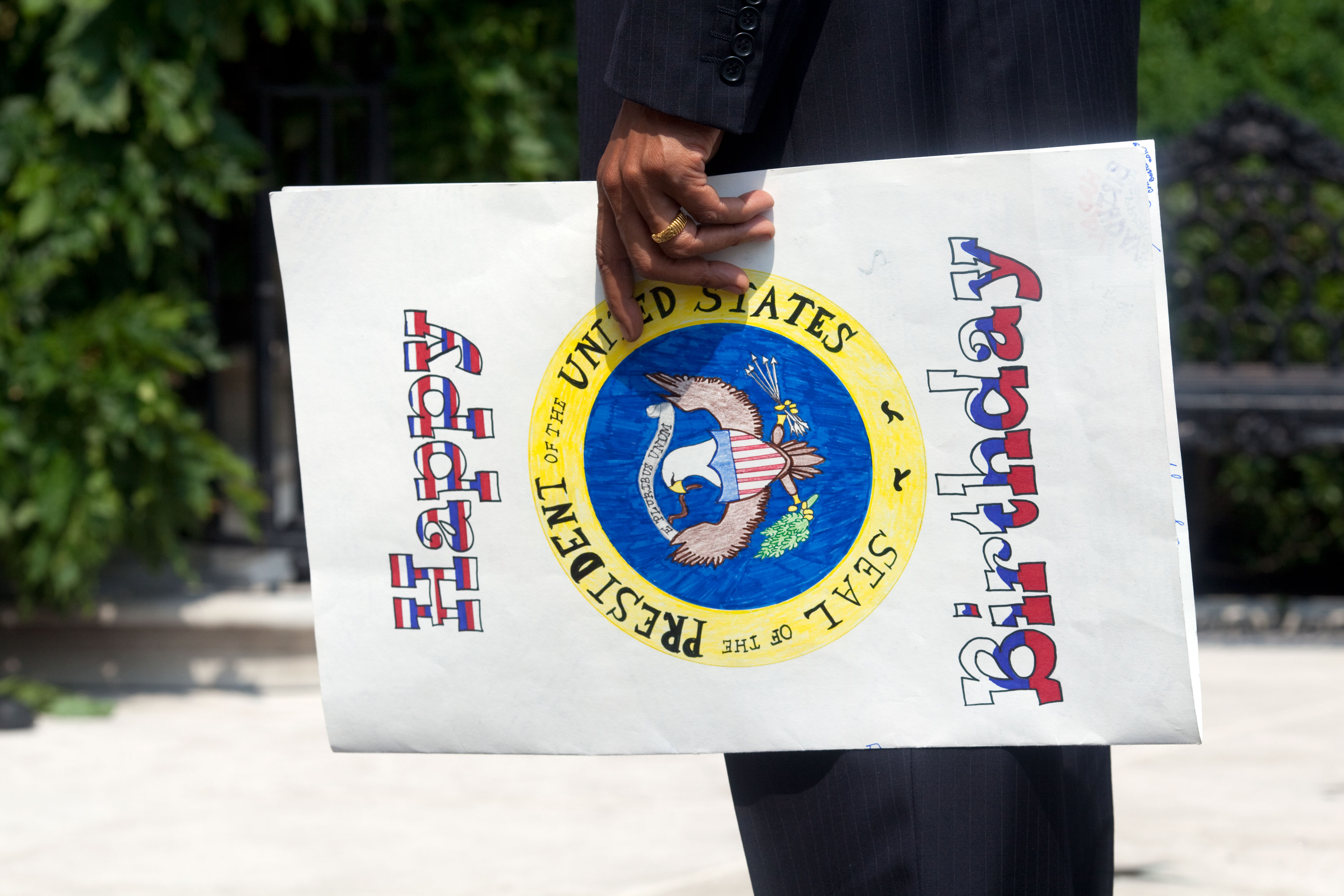
A 2009 birthday card that Barack Obama received from a group of White House interns.

As written in the encyclopedia Celebrating Life Customs Around the World, birthday cards are the "most popular greeting card to send and account for around 60 percent of all greeting cards bought" (Williams). Birthday cards are an important part of different cultures, including, American culture.

These cards deliver different meanings, both on a personal and cultural level. Research suggests that birthday cards may be "indicators of societal attitudes towards aging, communication of love, and gender-based expressiveness." For example, one study analyzing 150 birthday cards in 1981 found negative views on aging portrayed through humor. A 2017 study of online greeting cards found similar portrayals. Because of the ubiquity of the sentiments in cards, sociologist Dana Sawchuk recommended replicating this research with undergraduates as a form of active learning.

In attempt to prevent high-risk drinking at 21st birthday celebrations in the United States, several public health studies have used birthday cards to try to modify drinking behavior. A 2009 survey of the attempts "indicated that the birthday card intervention was not successful at reducing drinking or consequences".

== History ==
There is evidence that the ancient Egyptians and the ancient Greeks celebrated certain days as the birthday of particular gods and the book of Genesis contains the description of a pharaoh’s birthday party, but it was the Romans who began the custom of celebrating the birth of ordinary men. Wooden tablets found at Vindolanda on Hadrian’s wall, record an invitation, dictated by Claudia Severa, inviting her friend to a birthday celebration and they probably represent the earliest form of birthday card yet discovered.

The mass-produced birthday card as we know it today, first made its appearance in mid-19th century Britain, shortly after the production of the first Christmas cards.

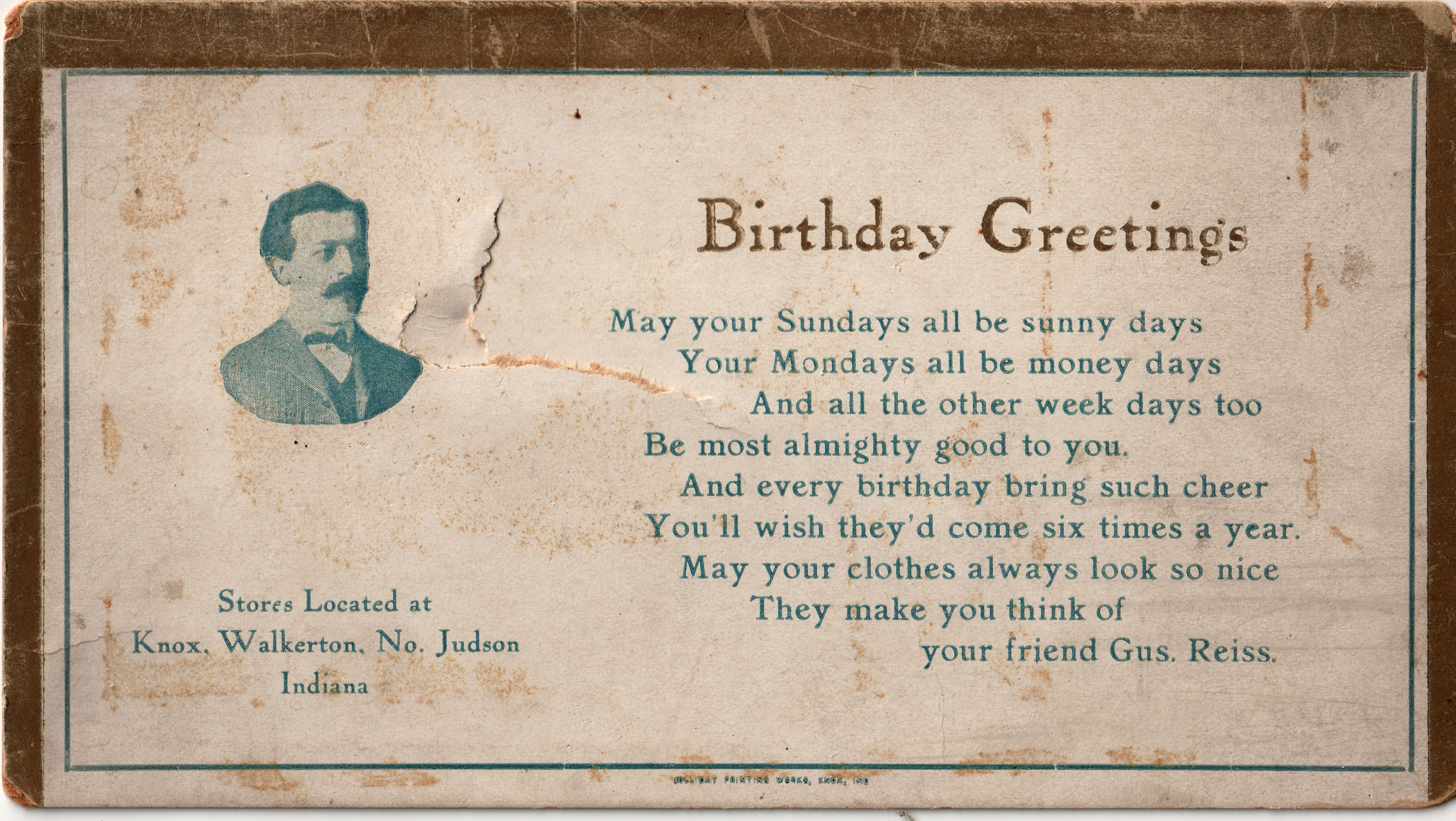
Birthday greeting used as advertising, 1920s

== Notable cards ==
Notable birthday cards include:

- A birthday card from the people of Poland to the United States in 1926, as part of the Sesquicentennial of the United States.
