= Sulis =

Celtic water deity

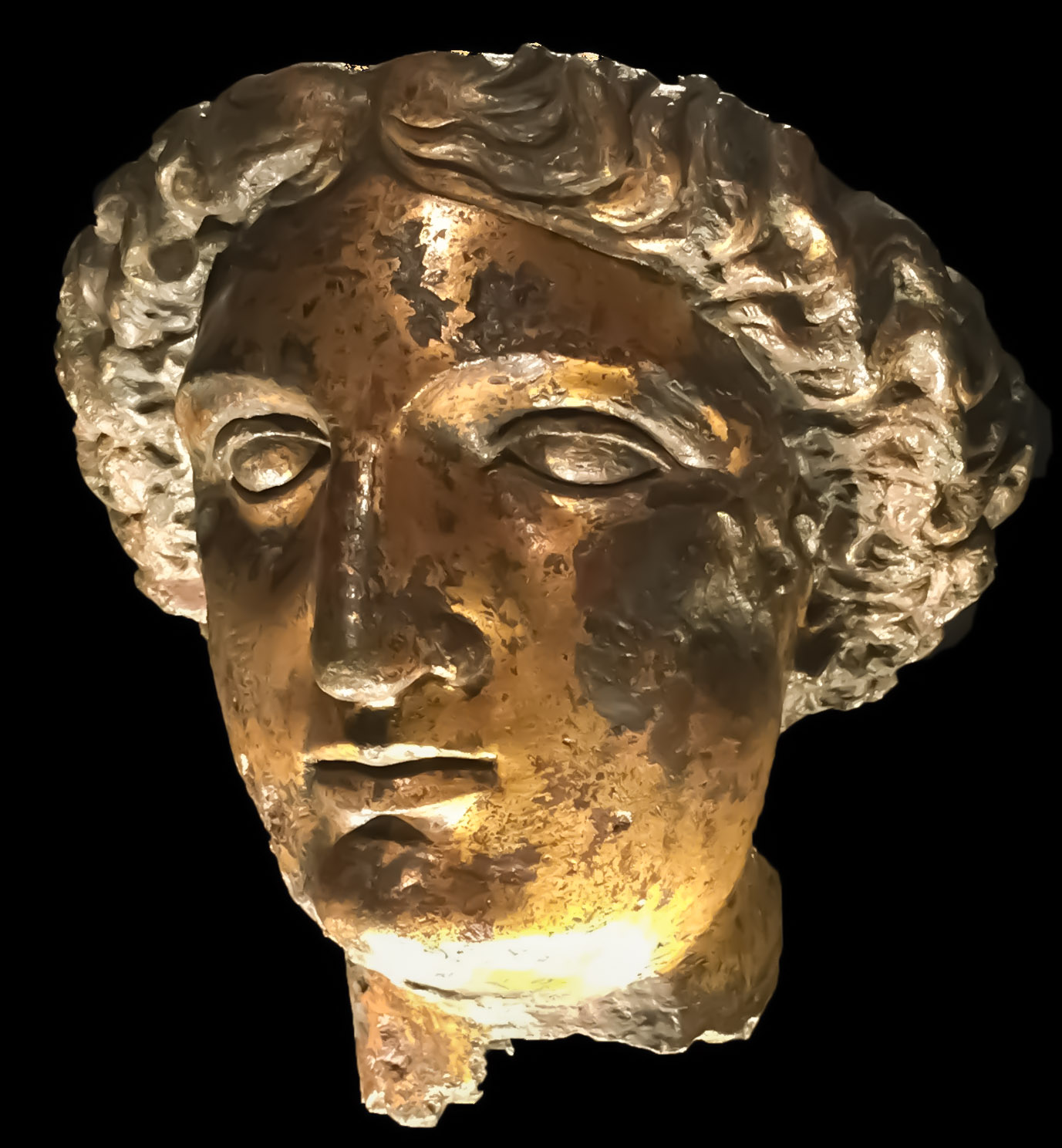
Gilt bronze head from the cult statue of Sulis Minerva from the Temple at Bath, found in Stall Street in 1727 and now displayed at the Roman Baths (Bath).

In the localised Celtic polytheism practised in Great Britain, Sulis (Note: While often rendered as "Sul" in modern times, the correct form of the name is Sulis. See Collingwood and Myres p. 264, and notes at RIB Tab.Sulis 10.) was a deity worshipped at the thermal spring of Bath. She was worshipped by the Romano-British as Sulis Minerva, whose votive objects and inscribed lead tablets suggest that she was conceived of both as a nourishing, life-giving mother goddess and as an effective agent of curses invoked by her votaries.

== Etymology ==
The exact meaning of the name Sulis has been a matter of debate, but an emerging consensus among linguists regards the name as cognate with Old Irish súil ("eye, sight").

A common Proto-Celtic root *sūli-, related to the various Indo-European words for "sun" (cf. Homeric Greek ἡέλιος, Sanskrit sūryah, from *suh_{2}lio-) has also been proposed, although the Brittonic terms for "sun" (Old Breton houl, Old Welsh heul) feature a diphthong that is absent from Sulis and they are not attested as a feminine form or with the -i- inflection. Pierre-Yves Lambert argues for a Proto-Celtic form *su-wli-, composed of the prefix su- ("good") attached to the Celtic verbal theme *wel- ("to see").

The medieval Welsh personal name Sulgen (< Sulien; "born from Sulis") and the Breton personal name Sul, borne by a local saint, are also related.

== Sul or Sulis ==
The forms Sul and Sulis are both used. Modern scholars prefer Sulis, but Sul is the traditional reading, and is also the common rendering on various non-specialist but nevertheless mainstream websites, e.g. the official website of the City of Bath.

Sul was the standard rendering until the 1979 discovery of a lead curse tablet from the sacred spring at Aquae Sulis which contained the phrase "dea Sulis," which is the first and only example preserving the deity's name in the nominative case. Scholars concluded that earlier readings or assumptions of the name as "Sul" (based on a belief that "Sulis" was a genitive form) were incorrect, and that the correct full form of the name is Sulis. However, the 1979 discovery did not end the debate. The lead tablet discovery was unique and is therefore too small a sample from which to draw a conclusion, and if we accept that the name is cognate with Old Irish súil ("eye, sight") then the Sul form would appear closer to its origin word, rather than Sulis.

A separate argument for the Sulis form is that the name is Brittonic, and no known Brittonic word ended in -l. Yet this too is not definitive, as known vocabulary from the time in question is scarce. A standard summary of Proto‑Celtic to Late Brittonic sound changes explicitly lists /l/ as a possible word‑final consonant, showing no rule that deletes or changes final -l. In that table, sequences like -VlV- and -ll- give Late Brittonic -l-, which continues as /l/ in Welsh, Cornish, and Breton, indicating that liquids, including l, were fully part of the consonant system and could appear at word edges. Modern Welsh has numerous inherited words and place‑names ending in written l, such as ysgol "school," which phonologically ends in /l/ in many dialects. Cornish and Breton likewise preserve native lexemes with final written l, so a blanket claim that "no Brittonic word ends in -l" does not match the comparative evidence for the Brittonic branch as a whole. The period during which the name was used is long enough for both forms to have existed.

== Cult at Bath ==
Sulis was the local goddess of the thermal springs that still feed the spa baths at Bath, which the Romans called Aquae Sulis ("the waters of Sulis"). Sulis was likely venerated as a healing divinity, whose sacred hot springs could cure physical or spiritual suffering and illness. According to scholar Miranda Green, the cult of Sulis at Bath was active until the mid-fourth century CE. Her name primarily appears on inscriptions discovered in an extensive temple area to her at Bath, with only a single instance outside of Britain at Alzey, Germany.

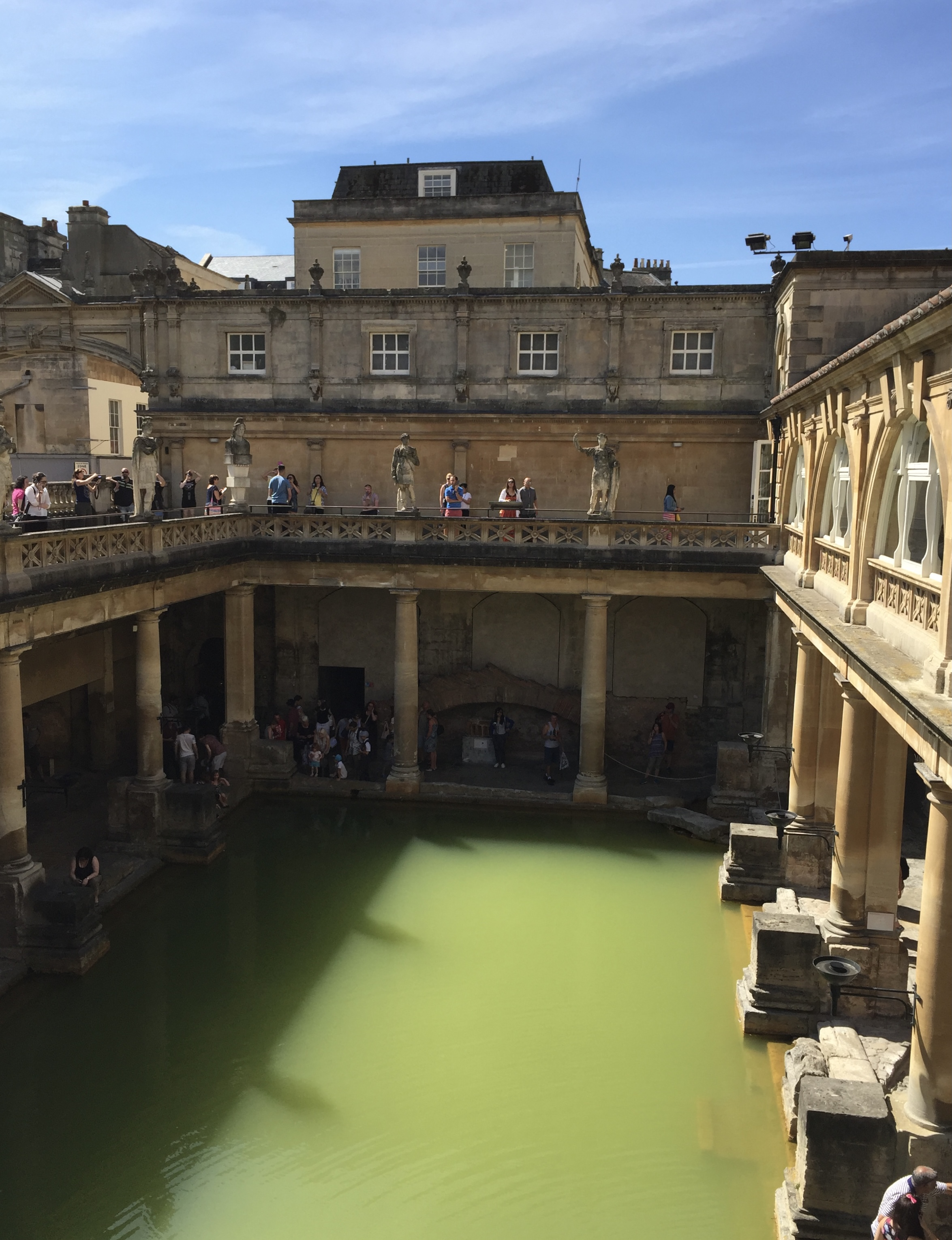
An overhead view of the Great Bath of the Roman Baths at Bath

At the Roman temple at Bath, several ancient additions to the altar area suggest that sacrifice there was a major part of worshipping the goddess. The open area surrounding the altar may have been used for processions and public offerings of meats and liquids. A majority of the finds at the spring consist of coins and curse tablets (see "Inscribed tablets" section next), with over 12,500 Roman coins and 18 Celtic coins having been found in the reservoir. In addition, items have also been retrieved that were likely private offerings, such as jewelry, gemstones, plates, bowls, military items, wooden and leather objects.

Pewter vessels found in the spring reservoir have led some scholars to conclude that physical contact with the water may have been important for transfer of healing properties, with these vessels being used to pour the water over visitors' bodies.

From the evidence of funerary inscriptions discovered on the site, it appears that visitors to the sacred springs may have included retired soldiers, soldiers acting as tourists, and/or soldiers looking for relief from injury or illness. In order to afford the inscriptions, those who recorded their visit with altars or tombstones would likely have been of higher status.

The Temple to Sulis Minerva was known for burning coal in the altar-fire instead of wood. This coal would have been brought by slaves, who would also assist in cleaning and service for cult meals.

The gilt bronze cult statue of Sulis Minerva "appears to have been deliberately damaged" sometime in later Antiquity, perhaps by barbarian raiders, Christian zealots, or some other forces.

=== Inscribed tablets ===
About 130 curse tablets, mostly addressed to Sulis, have been found in the sacred spring at the Roman baths in Bath. Typically, the text on the tablets offered to Sulis relates to theft; for example, of small amounts of money or clothing from the bath-house. It is evident, from the localized style of Latin ("British Latin") used, that a high proportion of the tablets came from the native population. In formulaic, often legalistic, language, the tablets appeal to the goddess Sulis to punish the known or unknown perpetrators of the crime until reparations are made. Sulis is typically requested to impair the physical and mental well-being of the perpetrator, by the denial of sleep, causing normal bodily functions to cease, or even by death. These afflictions are to cease only when the property is returned to the owner or disposed of as the owner wishes, often by its being dedicated to the goddess. One message found on a tablet in the Temple at Bath (once decoded) reads: "Docimedis has lost two gloves and asks that the thief responsible should lose their minds [sic] and eyes in the goddess' temple."

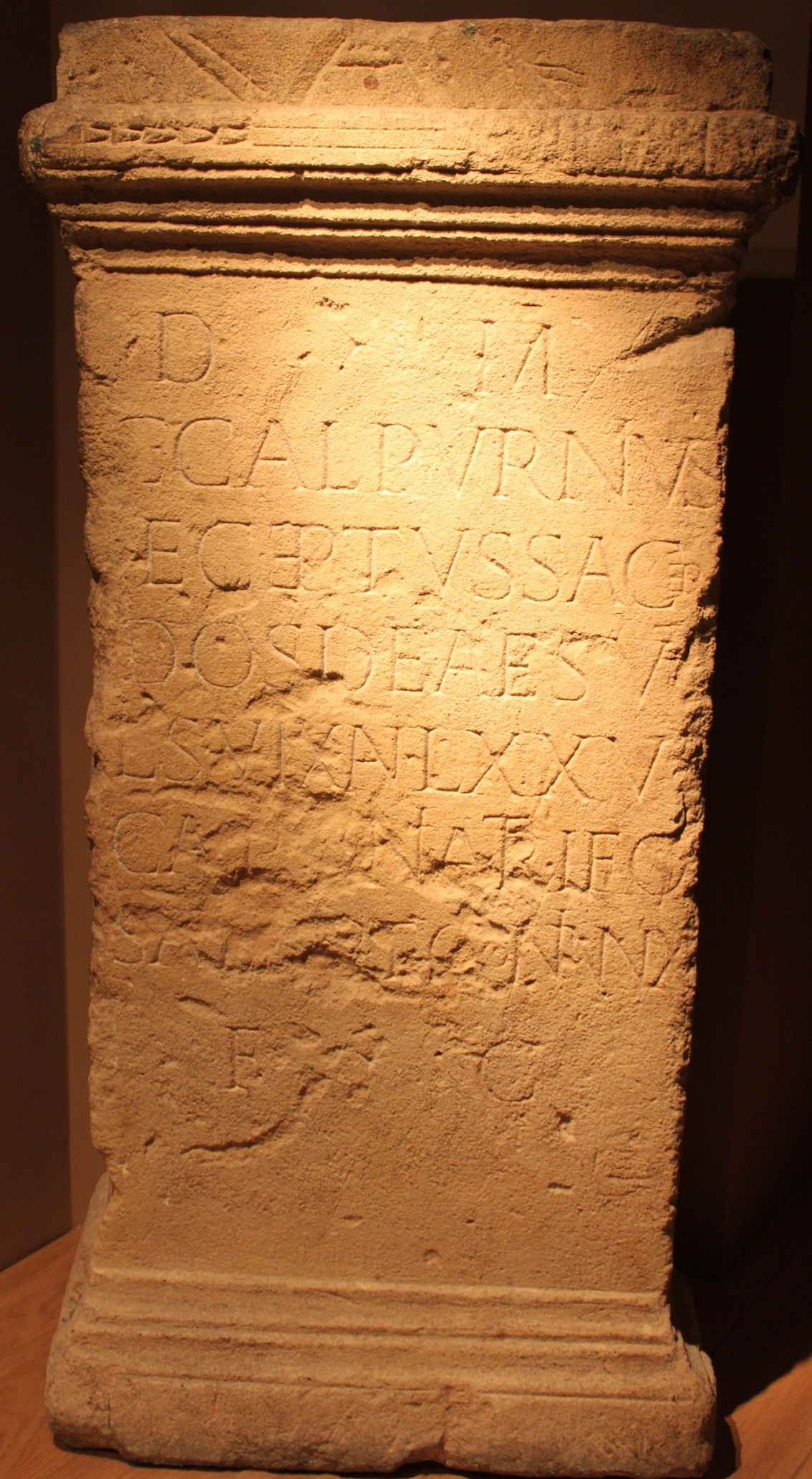
Latin epitaph of Gaius Calpurnius, a priest of Sulis at Bath, who died at the age of 75 and was commemorated by his wife, a freedwoman

The tablets were often written in code, by means of letters or words being written backwards; word order may be reversed and lines may be written in alternating directions, from left to right and then right to left (boustrophedon). While most texts from Roman Britain are in Latin, two scripts found here, written on pewter sheets, are in an unknown language which may be Brythonic. If so, they would be the only examples of writing in this language ever found.

The only dated tablet of the collection is Bath tablet 94, though no year is given alongside the day and month. This can be inferred, however, by comparison to handwriting used on other tablets, which range from the 'Old Roman cursive' of the second and third centuries CE to the 'New Roman cursive' of the fourth century CE. As argued by Tomlin in his 2020 publication, this shows the popularity of the inscriptions, and therefore the likely belief in their efficacy, for at least two centuries.

== Syncretism with Minerva ==
At Bath, the Roman temple was dedicated to Sulis Minerva as the primary deity of the temple spa. It is likely that devotion to Sulis existed in Bath before the Roman presence in the area, by the local Celtic Dobunni tribe, who may have believed that Sulis had curative powers. Sulis' pre-Roman presence has also been suggested by the discovery of eighteen Celtic Iron Age coins at the lowest levels of the site, as documented by Barry Cunliffe in 1988. This is one of the reasons Sulis is named first in the syncretic Sulis Minerva. Through the Roman Minerva syncresis, later mythographers have inferred that Sulis was also a goddess of wisdom and decisions.

Of the 17 dedicatory altars and bases found at the Roman temple at Bath, 9 evoke Sulis Minerva through her single or double name. In particular, there are two altars found at the Cross Bath (RIB 146) and Hot Bath (RIB 150) sites respectively, which list 'Sulis Minerva' in full. The altar found at the Hot Bath reads "To the goddess Sulis Minerva Sulinus, son of Maturus, willingly and deservedly fulfilled his vow" (RIB 150).

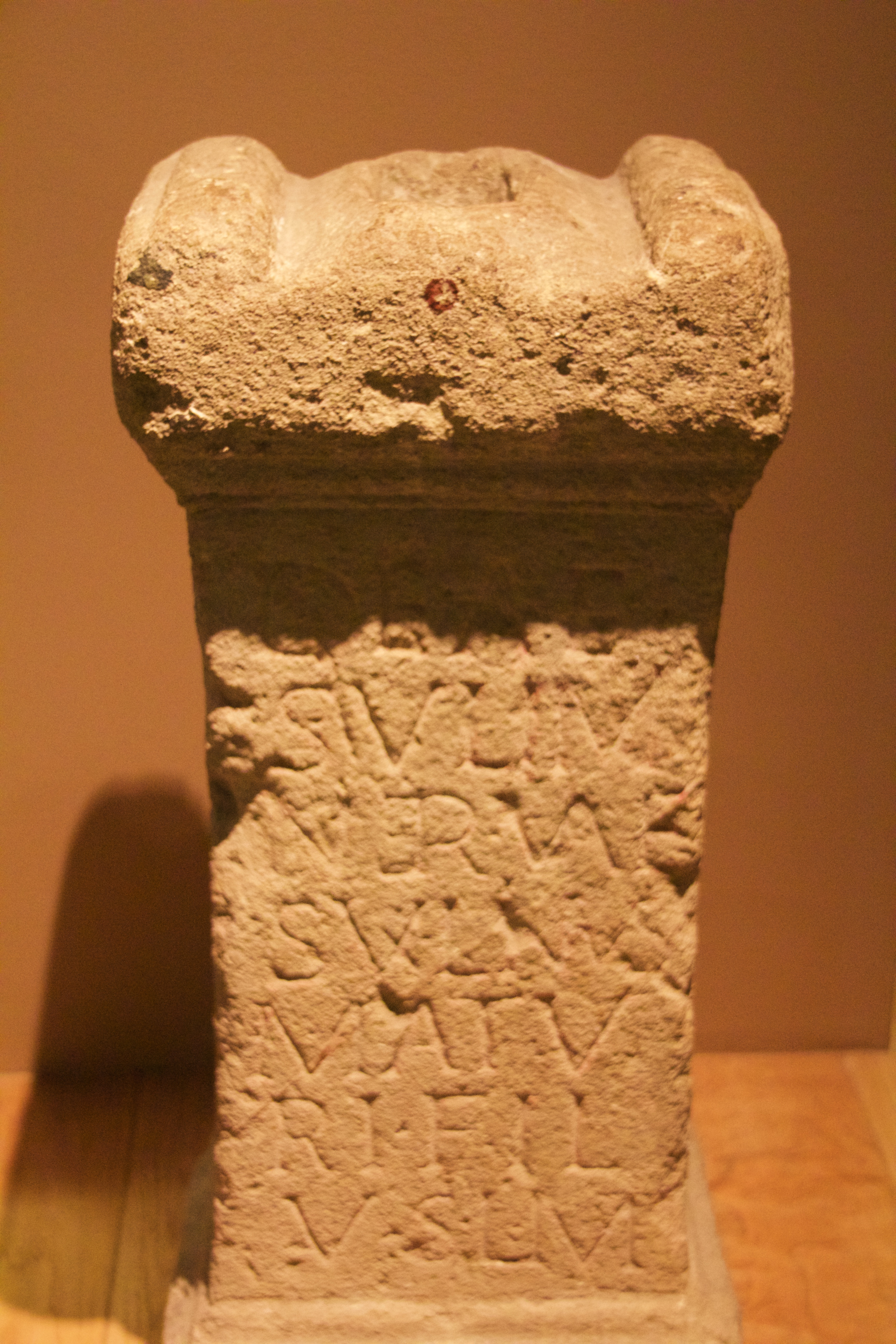
Altar from the Hot Bath, which reads "To the goddess Sulis Minerva Sulinus, son of Maturus, willingly and deservedly fulfilled his vow."

Sulis was not the only goddess exhibiting syncretism with Minerva. Senua's name appears on votive plaques bearing Minerva's image, while Brigantia also shares many traits associated with Minerva. The identification of multiple Celtic gods with the same Roman god is not unusual (both Mars and Mercury were paired with a multiplicity of Celtic names). On the other hand, Celtic goddesses tended to resist syncretism; Sulis Minerva is one of the few attested pairings of a Celtic goddess with her Roman counterpart.

Dedications to "Minerva" are common in both Great Britain and continental Europe, most often without any Celtic epithet or interpretation (cf. Belisama for one exception).

== Solar goddess ==
Based on her name's etymology, as well as several other characteristics, such as the association with sight, civic law, and epithets relating to light, Sulis has been interpreted as a solar deity, at least in pre-Roman times. Some researchers have further suggested a role as the de facto Celtic solar deity, the associated Sulevia and similar names being the goddess's attestations elsewhere.

== Modern worship ==
Sulis has a number of modern-day worshipers among the Wiccan and pagan communities. As of 1998, some people still deposited offerings in the waters of the Roman baths.

== Sulis in art and epigraphy ==
=== Sulis Minerva's head ===
A gilt bronze head of the goddess Sulis Minerva was discovered in Bath in 1727 (see top right), which was probably from a cult statue that stood inside her temple, next to the sacred spring. It is possible that this statue was positioned across the temple courtyard from the sacrificial altar site. The statue may be a product of the foundation of the Roman site, dating from the late first-century CE. There are only two other known gilt bronze finds from Roman Britain.

=== Temple pediment and Gorgon's head ===
Discovered in 1790, this pediment from the Temple of Sulis Minerva features a large Gorgon's head in its centre. It was likely carved in the first century CE, by craftsmen from northern Gaul. Originally at a height of fifteen metres, the pediment would have been supported by four fluted columns. There are also several accompanying images on the pediment, such as Tritons (the half-fish and half-men servants to Neptune), a face-helmet shaped like a dolphin's head, a small owl, and female Victories standing on globes.

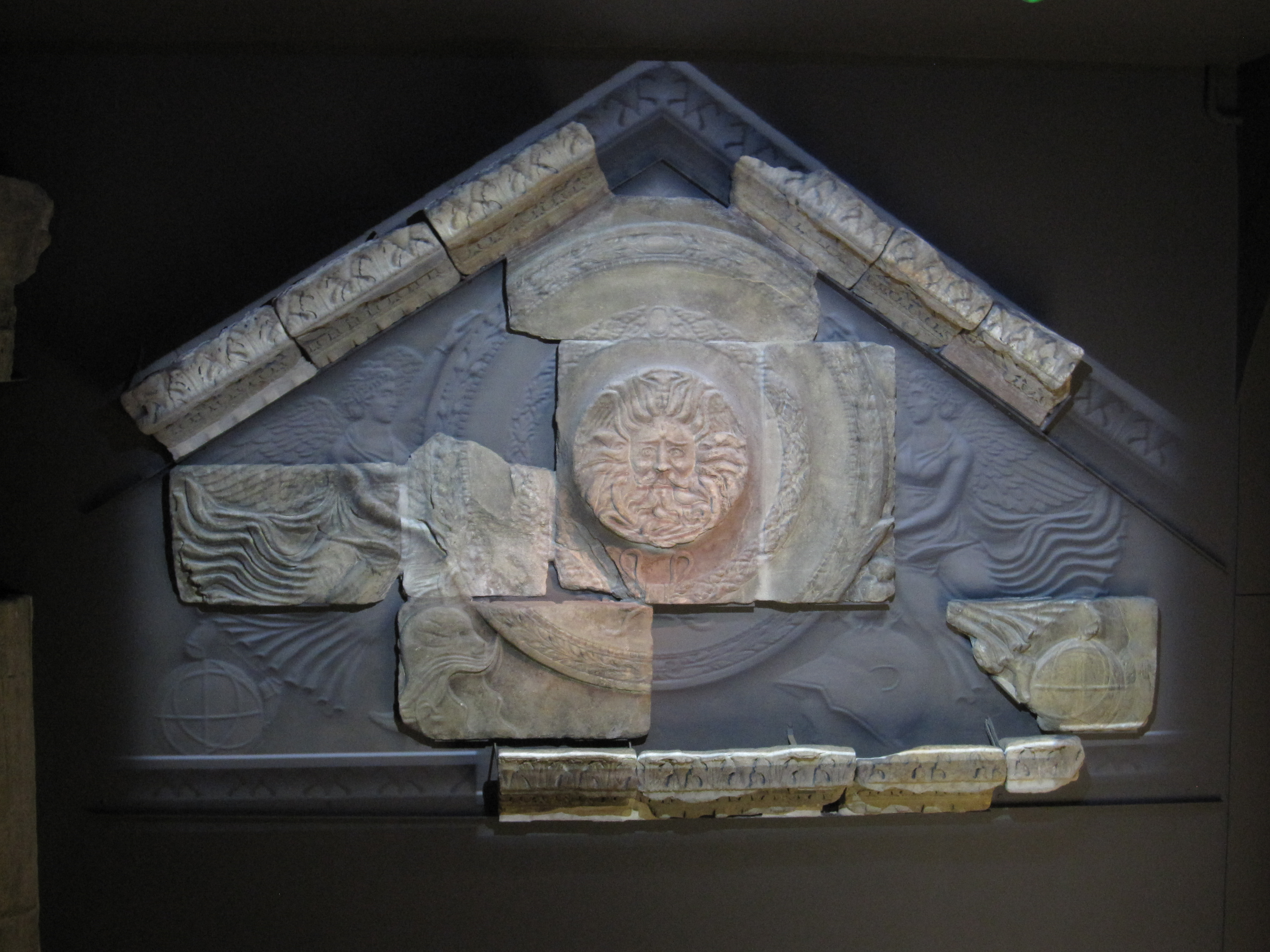
Pediment from Temple of Sulis Minerva at Bath

One interpretation of the central image, giving the piece its name, is that the head represents the mythical Gorgon. As Greek mythology has it, the hero Perseus killed the Gorgon and gave the head to Athena, who wore it on her breastplate. Thus, the Roman Baths Museum suggests a possible connection between the Gorgon to the goddess Sulis Minerva (Minerva being the Roman equivalent of the Greek Athena). While the Gorgon on the pediment is male and the mythical Gorgon was female, it has been suggested that the pediment image was altered to reflect a combination of Celtic and classical styles.

Another interpretation is that the central head reflects a water god, due to similarities with other water gods from Britain. For example, the Roman Baths Museum points to a silver dish from Mindenhall depicting the god Oceanus.

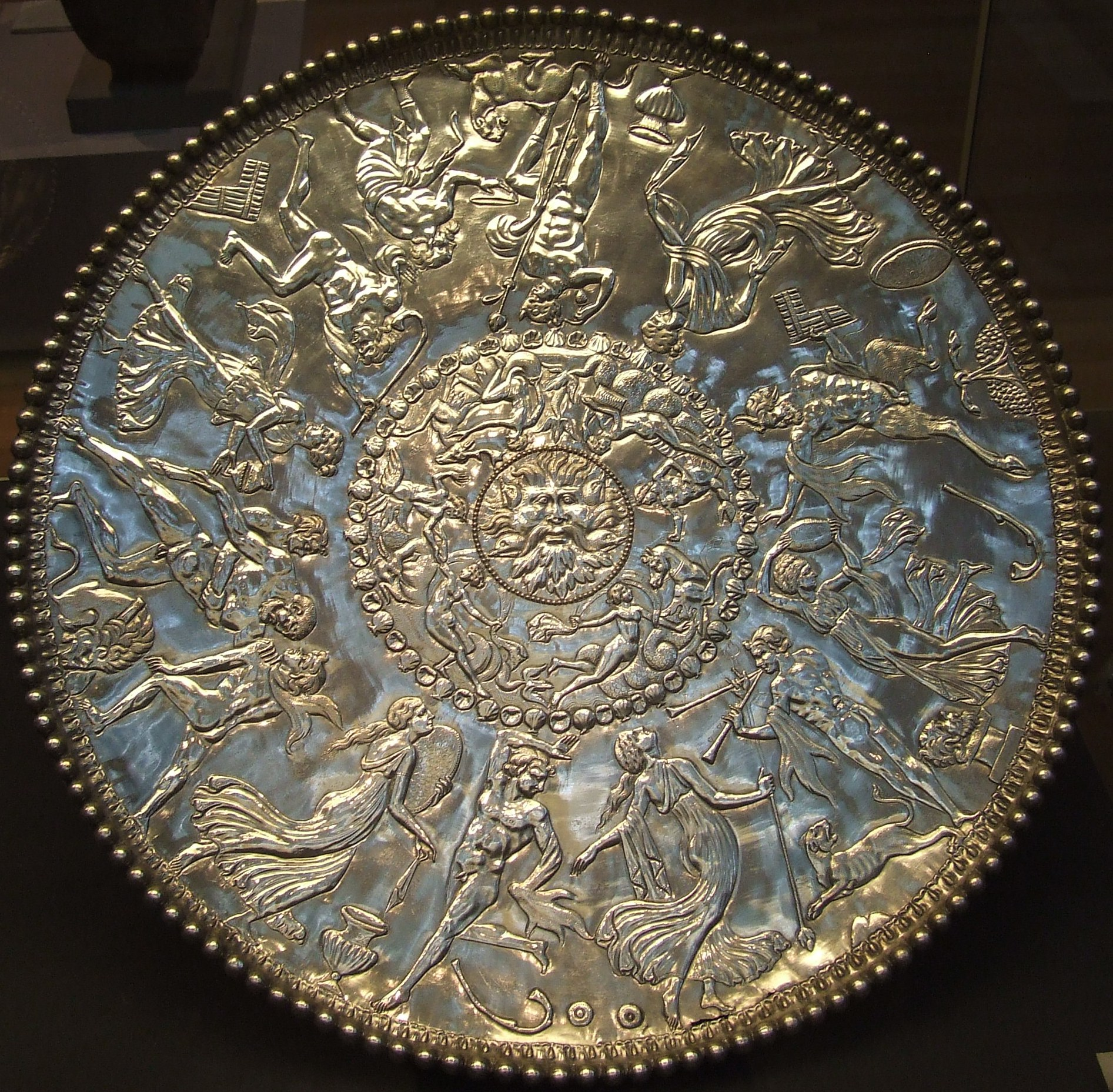
Silver dish depicting the god Oceanus from the Mildenhall treasure found in Suffolk, England, in 1942 or 1943.

In a 2016 article, Eleri H. Cousins argued that much of the imagery on the pediment can be linked to imperial iconography, including the Victories, the oak wreath and the star at its apex. In addition, Cousins highlighted other examples of similar first- and second-century architectural features, particularly Gorgon imagery found in Gaul and Spain, to suggest that the Forum of Augustus in Rome was used as an overall archetype. According to Cousins, the pediment and its imagery are not just 'Roman' or 'Celtic', but result from a mixture of styles and concepts from "the local to the empire-wide".

=== Altar-like statue base ===
The altar-like statue base was found on the pavement nearby the steps of the Temple for Sulis Minerva. The base reads, "To the goddess Sulis, Lucius Marcius Memor, soothsayer, gave (this) as a gift" (RIB III, 3049). This is the only known instance of a haruspex, or professional diviner who interpreted sacrificed animals' entrails, from Britain. The original inscription used the abbreviation 'HAR' to distinguish Memor as a haruspex, but it appears there was a later addition of the letters 'VSP'. This may have been an attempt to clarify his position as more than an informal 'soothsayer', and suggests that Memor may not have been attached to the temple itself, but rather that he may have been a visiting member of the governor's staff.

=== Altar-like tombstone ===
This tombstone resembling an altar (see top left) was found with two cinerary urns outside the city of Bath, in the parish of Bathwick, 800 metres north-east of the Roman Baths. The tombstone reads, "To the spirits of the departed; Gaius Calpurnius Receptus, priest of the goddess Sulis, lived 75 years; Calpurnia Trifosa, his freedwoman (and) wife, had this set up" (RIB 155). Receptus' widow's name, Trifosa, is Greek and means 'De Luxe', and would have likely been her given name when she was a slave, before she was freed and married to her former owner, the priest Receptus.

== Sulis in modern literature ==
Sulis has captured the attention of multiple creative writers and storytellers.

Sulis and the Roman Baths have been re-imagined in the following works of historical fiction:

- The Waters of Sul (1989) – Moyra Caldecott
- Flavia's Secret (2008) – Lindsay Townsend
- Crown of Acorns (2010) – Catherine Fisher
- The Curse-Maker (2011) – Kelli Stanley
- Memento Mori: A Crime Novel of the Roman Empire (2018) – Ruth Downie
- The Sinister Booksellers of Bath (2023) – Garth Nix

== See also ==
- List of solar deities
- Solsbury Hill
- Water and religion
