= Sulpicia Lepidina =

Early 2nd century wife of a Roman prefect

Sulpicia Lepidina was the wife of Flavius Cerialis, Prefect of the Ninth Cohort of Batavians, stationed at Vindolanda (Note: Vindolanda was previously known by the name of the nearby farm Chesterholm, and is situated just south of the Roman Stanegate road, 2 miles (3 km) SW of the fort of Housesteads on Hadrian's Wall in Northumberland, England) in Roman Britain in the early 2nd century AD. She is known from her correspondence, including a birthday invitation she received from Claudia Severa.

== Description ==
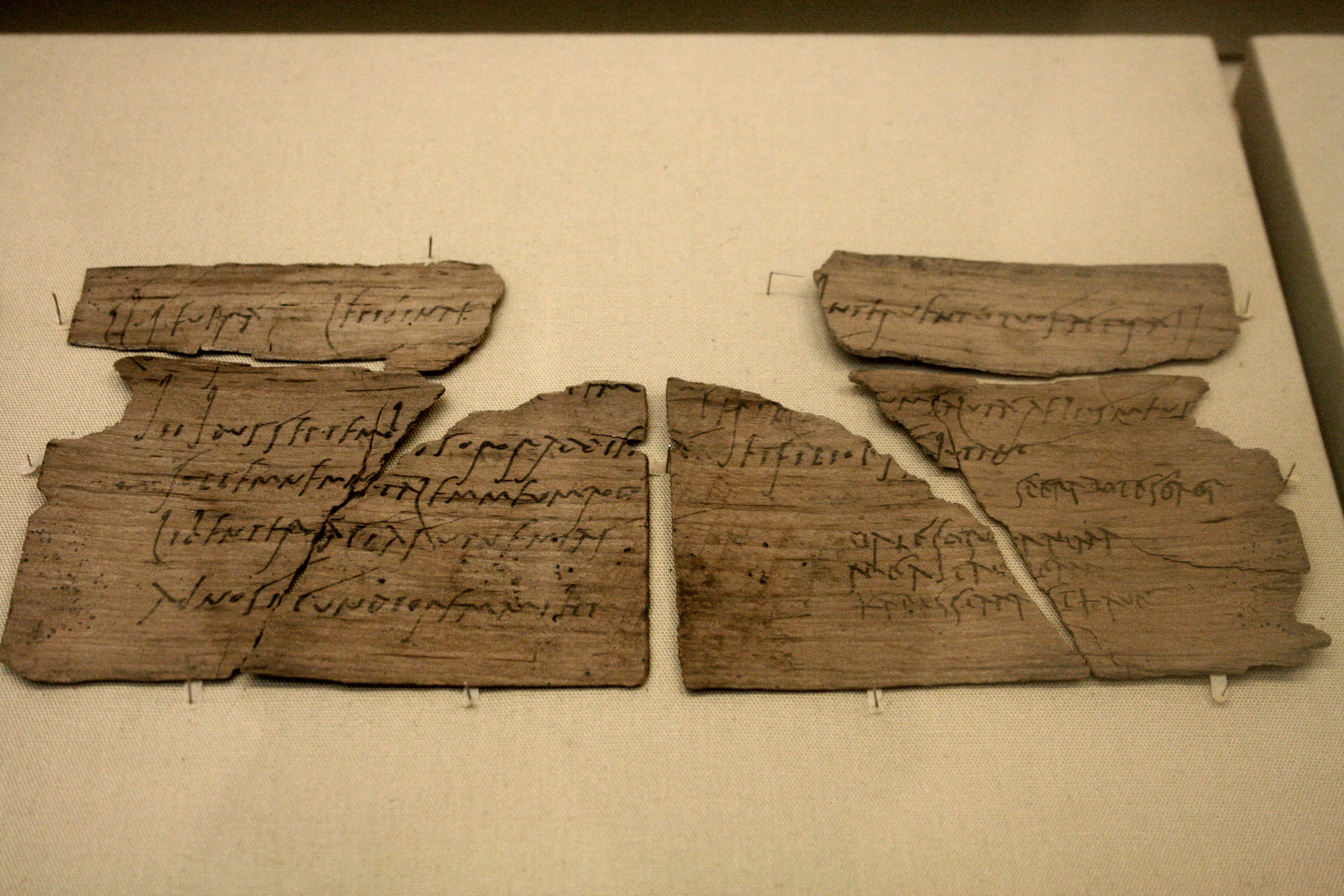
A letter from Claudia Severa inviting Sulpicia Lepidina to her birthday party.

Sulpicia Lepidina received two letters from Claudia Severa, wife of Aelius Brocchus, commander (Note: Aelius Brocchus is deduced to be the prefect (commander) of an unknown fort within easy reach of Vindolanda) of a nearby fort. One of the letters from Severa is an invitation to a birthday party, which is perhaps the best-known of the Vindolanda tablets now at the British Museum. The invitation is partly written by a scribe and partly by Severa herself. Along with another tablet (a fragment with a closure written in Severa's hand), the invitation is thought to be the oldest extant writing by a Roman woman found in Britain, or perhaps anywhere. The subject-matter of the letters is social and personal, and Severa calls Lepidina her sister.

Sulpicia Lepidina also received a letter from another woman. While the name of the woman is difficult to read, the subject matter is legible. In this letter the woman, thought to be called Paterna, speaks either of remedies that she plans to bring to Lepidina, or else two ancillae, enslaved girls, free from fever, are to be brought, one for Lepidina and one for someone whose name is lost from the text. The text of this tablet is too damaged to be able to determine which of these translations is correct.

The letters were written in ink on wooden tablets (Note: The tablets are of thin wood, about the size of a postcard. Many are fragmentary and all are difficult to read and decipher. On many the ink faded on exposure to the air, and special techniques have to be used to read the text.) found during excavations at Vindolanda in the 1970s. Vindolanda was a Roman fort built where two streams conjoined and, as a result, the floors of the fort were thick with mosses, bracken and straw. The Vindolanda tablets were found in this thick carpet and filled-in ditches. Their preservation was due to the waterlogged soil conditions on parts of the Vindolanda site.

== See also ==
- Sulpicia gens
