= Bath curse tablets =

Collection of Roman era curse tablets

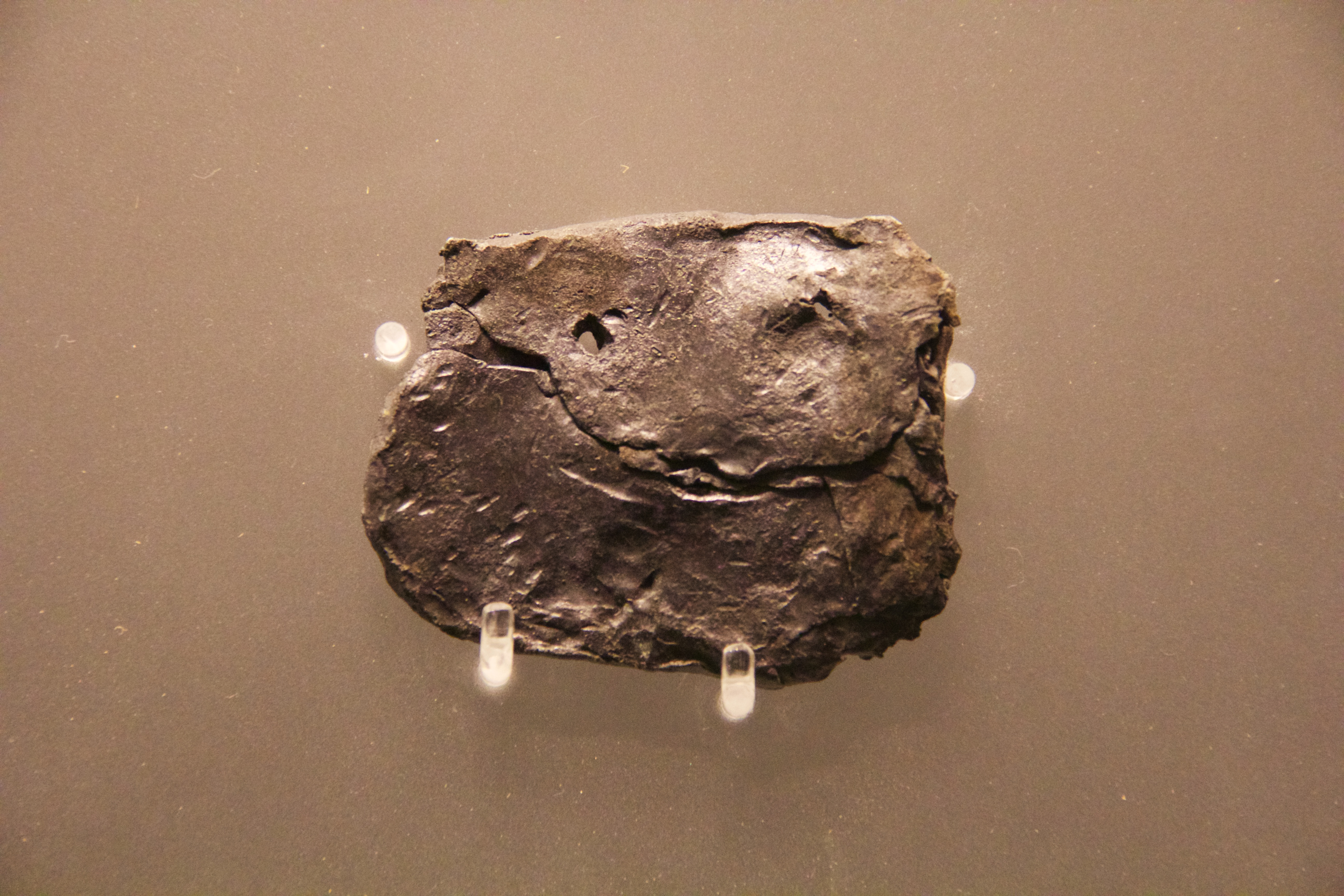
One of the Bath curse tablets on display at the Roman Baths Museum, Bath

The Bath curse tablets are a collection of about 130 Roman era curse tablets (or defixiones in Latin) discovered in 1979/1980 in the English city of Bath. The tablets were requests for intervention of the goddess Sulis Minerva in the return of stolen goods and to curse the perpetrators of the thefts. Inscribed mostly in British Latin, they have been used to attest to the everyday spoken vernacular of the Romano-British population of the second to fourth centuries AD. They have also been recognised by UNESCO in its Memory of the World UK Register.

== Discovery and description ==
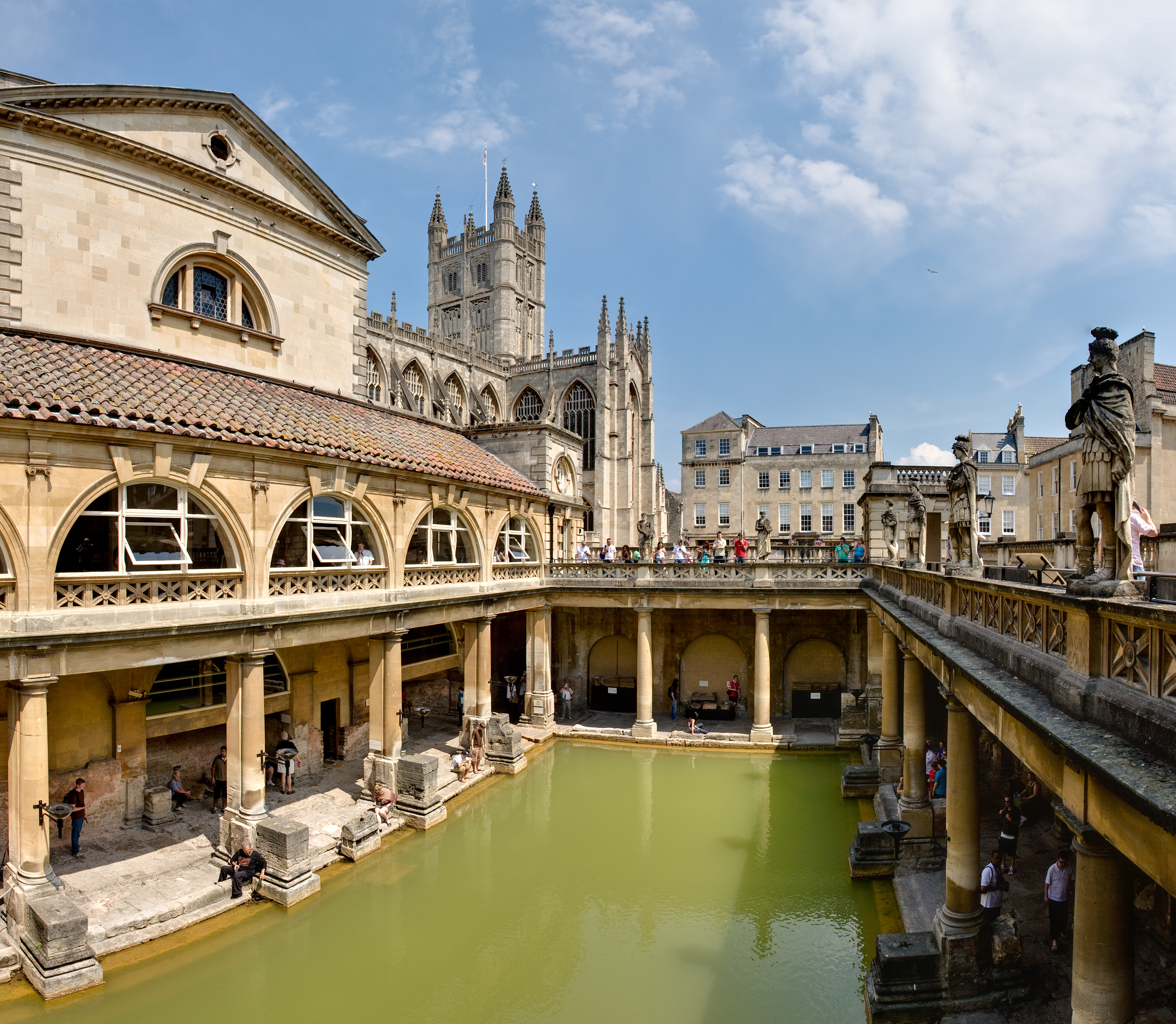
The Roman baths at Bath — the entire structure above the level of the pillar bases is post-Roman.

The Roman baths and temple dedicated to the goddess Sulis Minerva in the English city of Bath (founded by the Romans as Aquae Sulis) were excavated between 1978 and 1983 by a team led by Barry Cunliffe and Peter Davenport. In 1979/1980, around 130 tablets were discovered in an excavation of the "Sacred Spring" under the King's Bath. This excavation was made possible by the removal of the concrete floor and walls, revealing a huge array of Roman era items including the tablets. The findings at the spring highlight what Sulis Minerva meant to the people here.

The tablets, some in a fragmentary state, were small and rectangular and initially were assumed to be made of lead, although subsequent metallurgical analysis revealed that they are, in fact, made of lead alloyed with tin, with occasional traces of copper. Some of the tablets were cast under pressure into thin, flexible sheets with a finish as smooth as paper whereas others appear to have been roughly hammered out from a molten lump. Most of the tablets were inscribed, either with Roman capitals or with cursive script, but the expertise of the lettering varied. Some of the tablets had markings that appear to be an illiterate imitation of lettering, for example repetitive lines of crosses or sevens, and some were completely blank.

The inscriptions on the tablets were published in full in 1988 by historian Roger Tomlin. The tablets themselves are on public display at the Roman Baths Museum in Bath.

== Creation and ritual ==
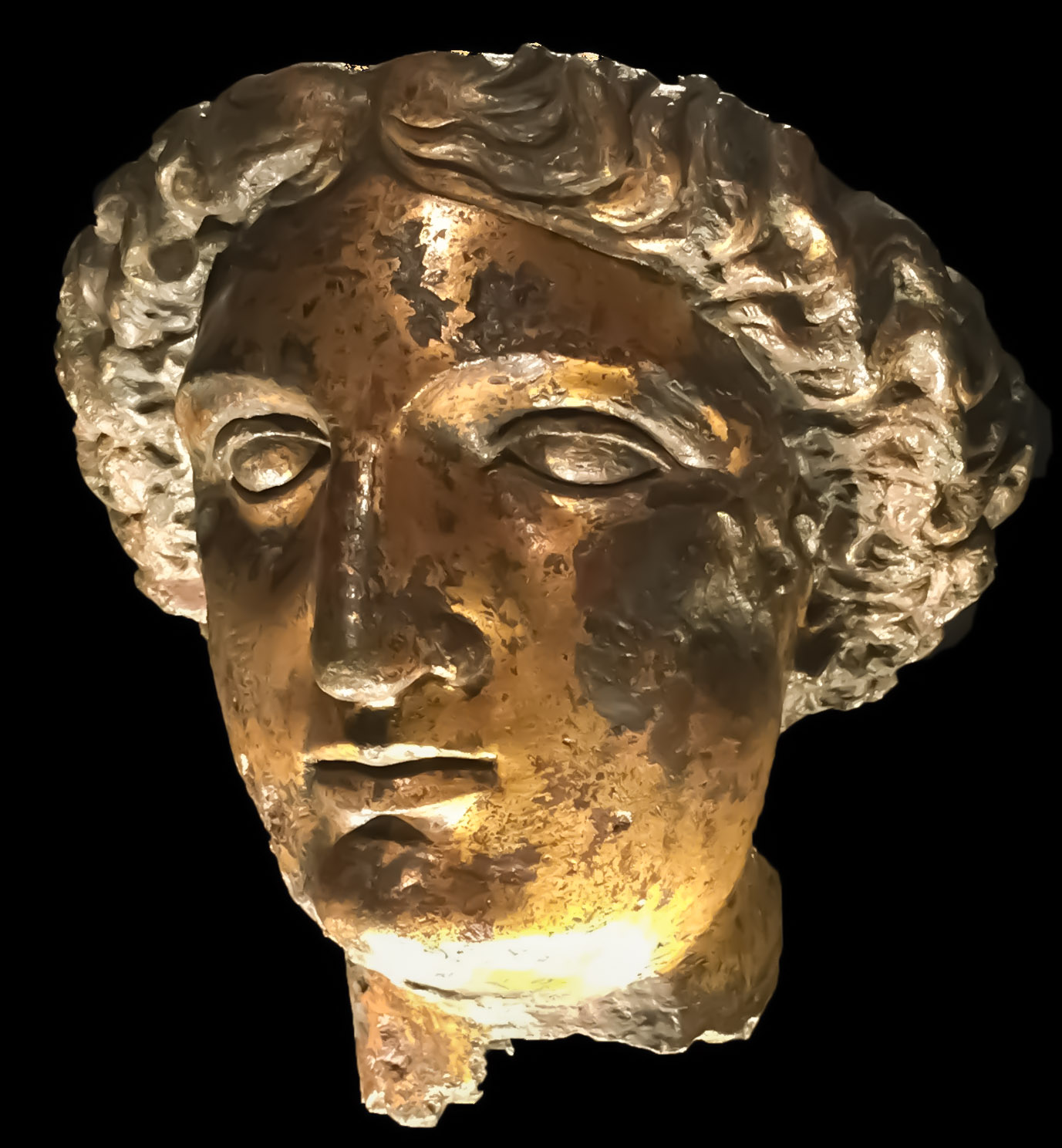
Gilt bronze head of Sulis Minerva, to whom the curse tablets were addressed, found at her temple in Bath.

The tablets were identified as “curse tablets” dating from the second to fourth centuries AD. Curse tablets are metal sheets inscribed with curses against specific people who committed petty theft. The tablets were meant to call upon the gods for assistance in seeking justice and were popular throughout the Roman world.

In the case of the Bath curse tablets the written formulae inscribed on the tablets were addressed to the goddess Sulis, who had the power to identify the thief and exact punishment. The formulation of the tablets was part of a ritual known as a "prayer for justice" to the goddess and combined elements of magic and religion. The aim of the prayer was not for the culprit to be actually punished. It acted as a threat whereby the thief would be punished if the items were not returned. In order for the curse to operate, the victim would have to first gift the item to the deity so that, in effect, it was a theft from Sulis herself.

The inscriptions were likely completed by individuals specialising in this activity and typically followed a four step process. Although many tablets are believed to have been created by specialists, there is also evidence that amateur cursers also engaged in creating them. Each of the four steps was critical for the supposed success of the curse. The first step was the drawing up of the curse text. This was to check that the length of the text fit the size of the tablet sheet. The second step was the production of the tablet using specialist equipment. The third step was the inscribing of the tablet. Numerous handwriting styles were used and sometimes ornate detail was included, which has led to speculation on the scribe’s role. It is believed that some tablets were created by “amateurs” or illiterate people who nevertheless trusted that the deity would decipher their curse marks. The final step was depositing the tablet in the appropriate place. This depended on which deity was being addressed. In the case of the Bath curse tablets, this was a body of water at a temple sacred to Sulis.

== Inscriptions ==
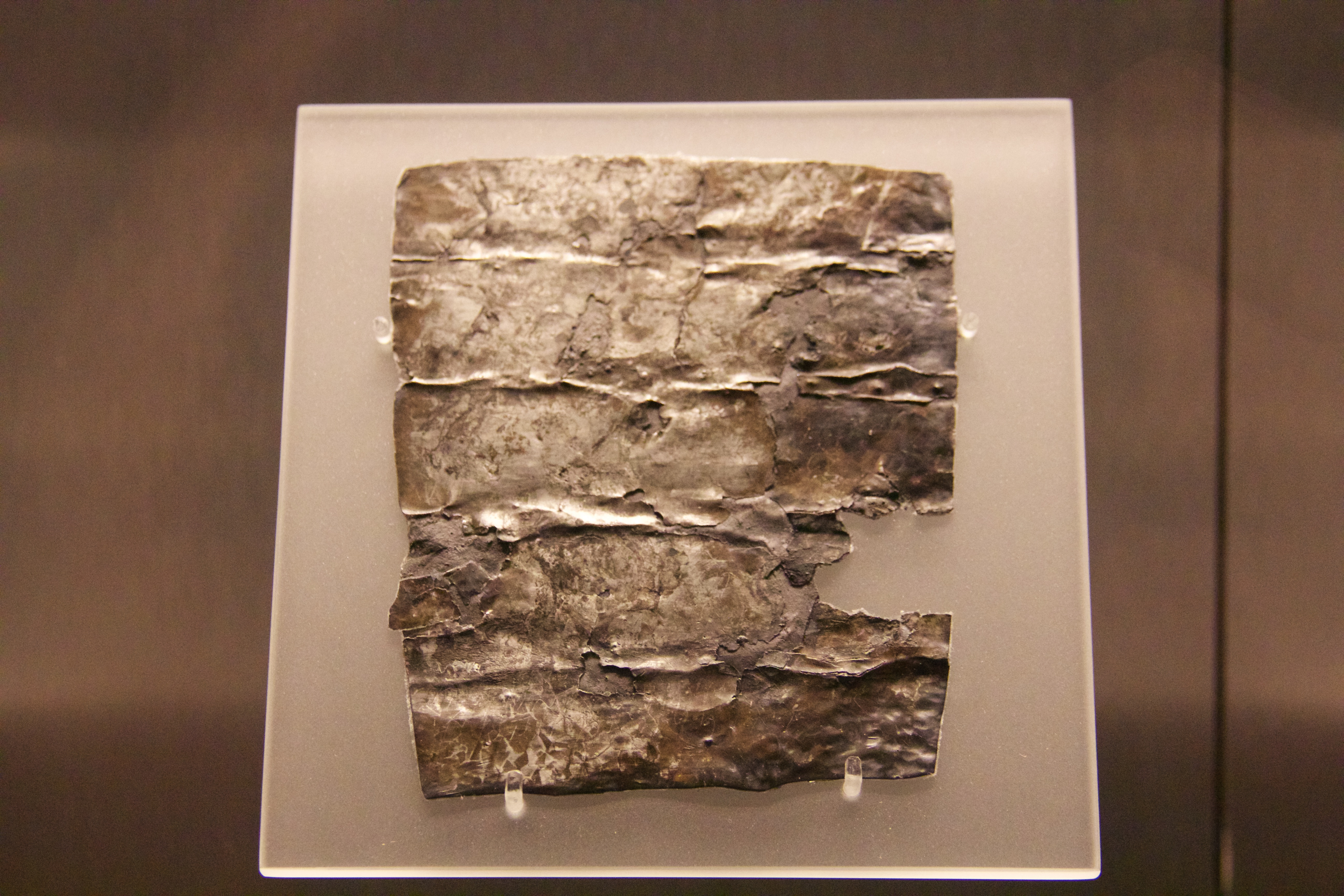
Curse tablet with complaint about theft of a cloak and bathing tunic

=== Language ===
Most of the inscriptions are in colloquial Latin, and specifically in the Vulgar Latin of the Romano-British population, known as "British Latin". Two of the inscriptions are in a language which is not Latin, although they use Roman lettering, and may be in a British Celtic language. If this should be the case, they would be the only examples of a written ancient British Celtic language; however, there is not yet scholarly consensus on their decipherment.

=== Content ===
All but one of the 130 Bath curse tablets concern the restitution of stolen goods and are a type of curse tablet known as "prayers for justice". The complained of thefts are generally of personal possessions from the baths such as jewellery, gemstones, money, household goods and especially clothing. Theft from public baths appears to have been a common problem as it was a well-known Roman literary stereotype and severe laws existed to punish the perpetrators. Most of the depositors of the tablets (the victims of the thefts) appear to have been from the lower social classes.

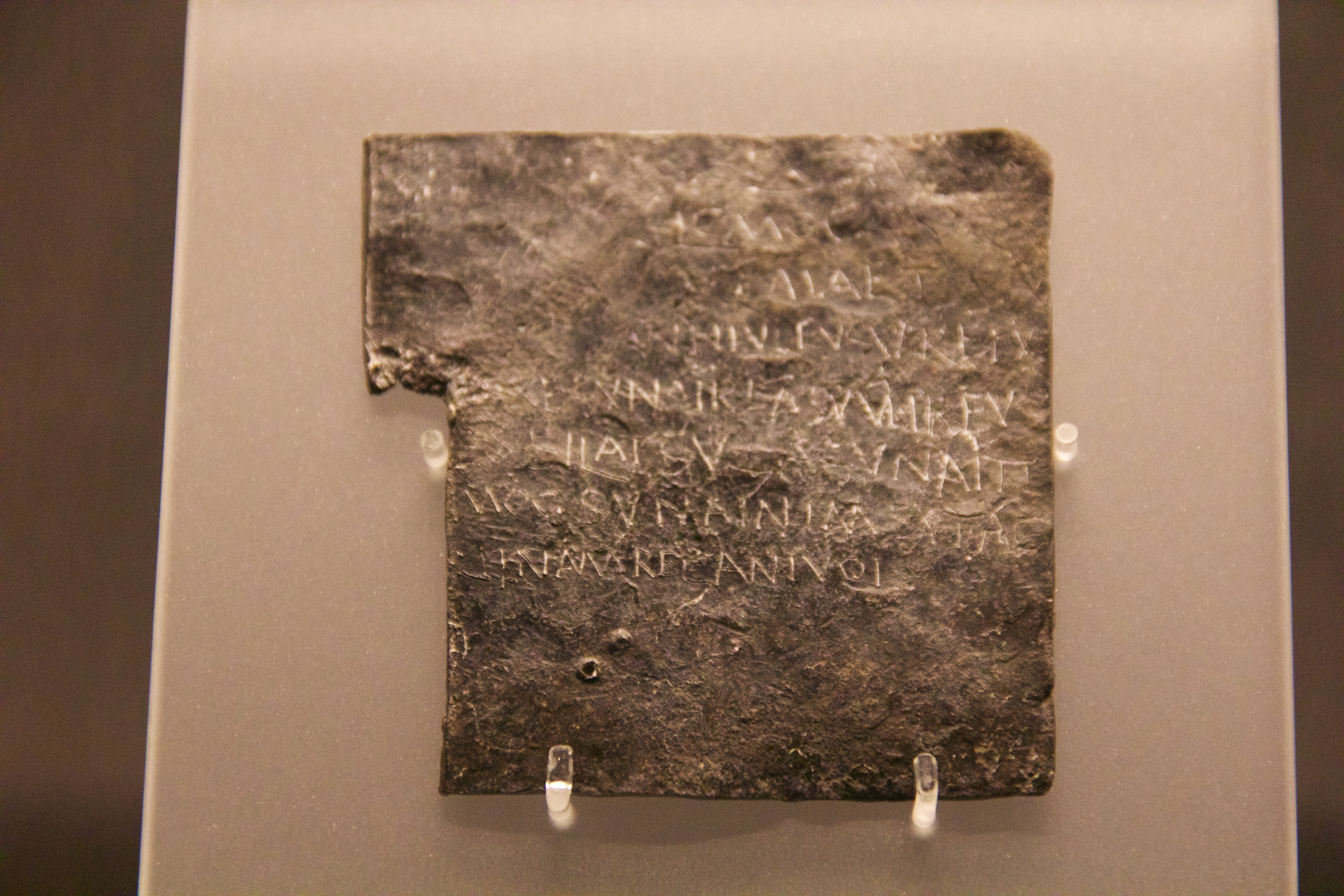
Curse tablet with complaint about the theft of Vilbia

The inscriptions generally follow the same formula, suggesting it was taken from a handbook: the stolen property is declared as having been transferred to a deity so that the loss becomes the deity’s loss; the suspect is named and, in 21 cases, so is the victim; the victim then asks the deity to visit afflictions on the thief (including death) not as a punishment but to induce the thief to hand the stolen items back. Once created, the tablets were later deposited by the victims in the spring that was sacred to the goddess Sulis Minerva herself.

=== Examples ===
The Bath Curse Tablets include several different texts, all with a similar goal. Some wish for the goddess to kill their offender, while others seek alternative forms of justice. A typical example reads:

Solinus to the goddess Sulis Minerva. I give to your divinity and majesty [my] bathing tunic and cloak. Do not allow sleep or health to him who has done me wrong, whether man or woman or whether slave or free unless he reveals himself and brings those goods to your temple.

The formula "whether man or woman or whether slave or free" is typical, and the following example is unusual in two respects. Firstly it adds the words "whether pagan or Christian" and secondly the text was written in reversed lettering:

Whether pagan or Christian, whether man or woman, whether boy or girl, whether slave or free whoever has stolen from me, Annianus [son of] Matutina (?), six silver coins from my purse, you, Lady Goddess, are to exact [them] from him. If through some deceit he has given me...and do not give thus to him but reckon as (?) the blood of him who has invoked his upon me.

Many name the suspected thieves:

I have given to the goddess Sulis the six silver coins which I have lost. It is for the goddess to exact [them] from the names written below: Senicianus and Saturninus and Anniola.

Some of the inscriptions are very specific in the afflictions requested and reveal the intensity of the victim's anger:

Docimedis has lost two gloves and asks that the thief responsible should lose their minds [sic] and eyes in the goddess' temple.

May he who carried off Vilbia from me become liquid as the water. May she who so obscenely devoured her become dumb.

...so long as someone, whether slave or free, keeps silent or knows anything about it, he may be accursed in (his) blood, and eyes and every limb and even have all (his) intestines quite eaten away if he has stolen the ring or been privy (to the theft).

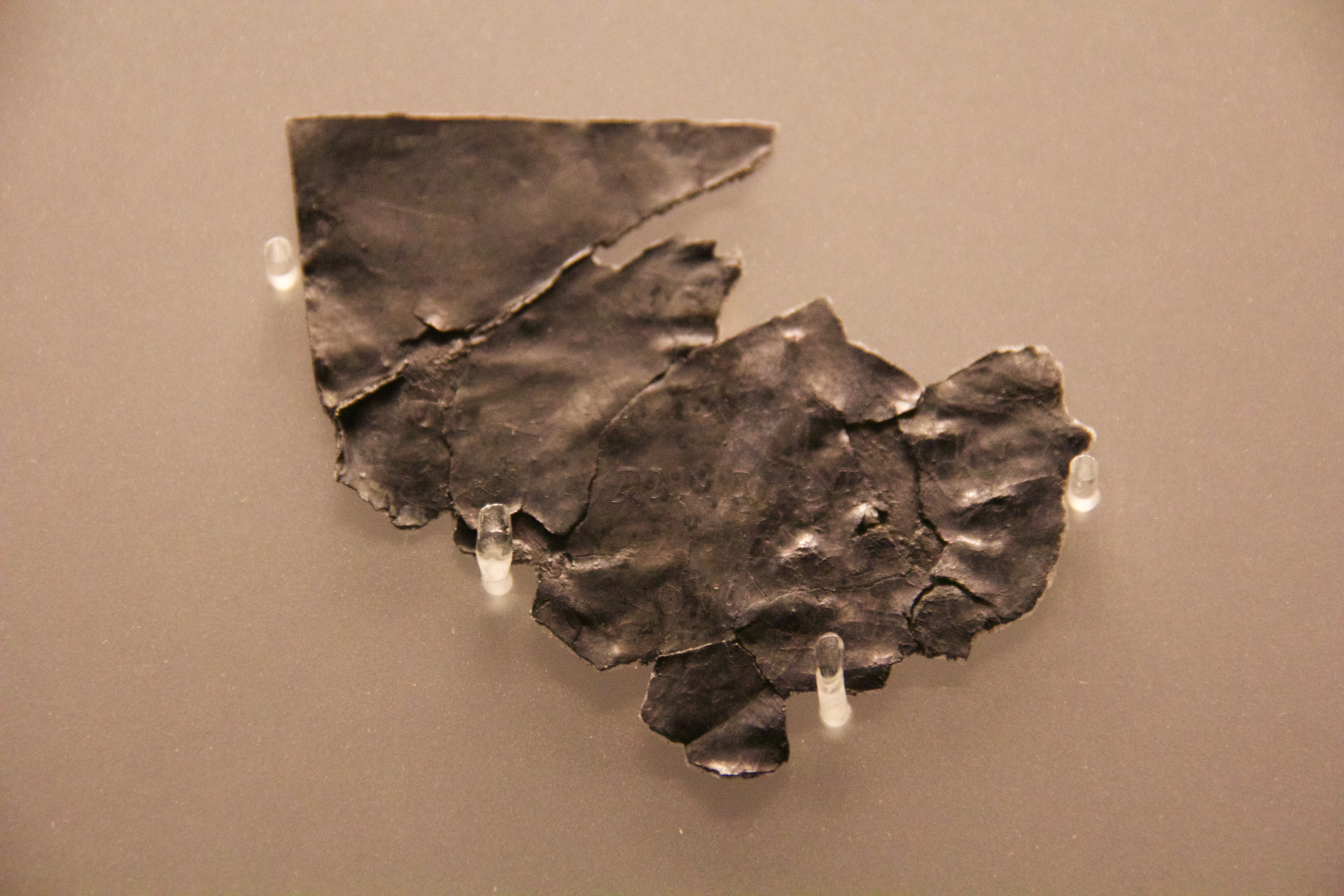
Curse tablet thought to have text in British Celtic

One of the suspected British Celtic inscriptions has been translated as:

The affixed – Deuina, Deieda, Andagin, (and) Uindiorix – I have bound.

An alternative translation of the above inscription is:

May I, Windiorix for/at Cuamena defeat (alt. summon to justice) the worthless woman, oh divine Deieda.

== Significance ==
The Bath curse tablets are the most important record of Romano-British religion yet published. Curse tablets are of particular use in evidencing the Vulgar Latin of everyday speech, and, since their publication in 1988, the Bath inscriptions have been used as evidence of the nature of British Latin. Additionally, the contents of the inscriptions have been used as evidence of popular attitudes to crime and the system of justice.

In 2014, the Bath curse tablets were recognised by UNESCO in its Memory of the World UK Register.

== See also ==
- Vindolanda tablets
- Larzac tablet
- Ring of Silvianus

== Bibliography ==
- Adams, J. N. (1992). "British Latin: The Text, Interpretation and Language of the Bath Curse Tablets". Britannia. 23: 1–26. doi:10.2307/526102. ISSN 0068-113X. JSTOR 526102. S2CID 163388305.
- Adams, J. N. (2007). The Regional Diversification of Latin 200 BC - AD 600. Cambridge University Press. ISBN 978-0-521-88149-4.
- Adams, Geoffrey W. (2005). Romano-Celtic Élites and Their Religion: A Study of Archaeological Sites in Gloucestershire. Caeros Pty. ISBN 978-0-9758445-1-9.
- Bath Roman Baths Museum (2014). "Key objects of the collection". The Roman Baths, Bath.
- BBC News (25 June 2014). "Roman curse tablets from Bath recognised by Unesco". BBC.
- Collins, Derek (2008). Magic in the Ancient Greek World. John Wiley & Sons. ISBN 978-0-470-69572-2.
- Cunliffe, Barry (1983). "The Temple of Sulis Minerva at Bath". Archaeology. 36 (6): 16–23. ISSN 0003-8113. JSTOR 41728771.
- Dvorjetski, Esti (2007). Leisure, Pleasure and Healing: Spa Culture and Medicine in Ancient Eastern Mediterranean. BRILL. ISBN 978-90-04-15681-4.
- Eska, Joseph (2006). "Inscriptions in the Celtic World: Ancient". In Koch, John T. (ed.). Celtic Culture: A Historical Encyclopedia. Abc-Clio. pp. 965–970. ISBN 978-1-85109-440-0.
- Fagan, Garrett G. (2002). Bathing in Public in the Roman World. University of Michigan Press. ISBN 978-0-472-08865-2.
- Frend, William H. C. (2006). "Roman Britain, A Failed Promise". In Carver, Martin (ed.). The Cross Goes North: Processes of Conversion in Northern Europe, AD 300-1300. Boydell Press. pp. 79–93. ISBN 978-1-84383-125-9.
- Gager, John G. (1999). Curse Tablets and Binding Spells from the Ancient World. Oxford University Press. ISBN 978-0-19-513482-7.
- Gerrard, James (2008). "The End of Roman Bath". Current Archaeology (217): 21–31.
- Gordon, Richard Lindsay; Simón, Francisco Marco (2010). Magical Practice in the Latin West: Papers from the International Conference Held at the University of Zaragoza, 30 Sept. – 1st Oct. 2005. BRILL. ISBN 978-90-04-17904-2.
- Herman, József (2000) [1967]. Vulgar Latin. Pennsylvania State University Press. ISBN 978-0-271-02001-3.
- Mees, Bernard Thomas (2009). Celtic Curses. Boydell Press. ISBN 978-1-84383-457-1.
- Millett, Martin (2012). "Aquae Sulis". In Hornblower, Simon; Spawforth, Antony; Eidinow, Esther (eds.). The Oxford Classical Dictionary. OUP Oxford. ISBN 978-0-19-954556-8.
- Ogden, Daniel (1999). "Binding Spells: Curse Tablets and Voodoo Dolls in the Greek and Roman Worlds". In Ankarloo, Bengt; Clark, Stuart (eds.). Witchcraft and Magic in Europe, Volume 2: Ancient Greece and Rome. University of Pennsylvania Press. pp. 1–90. ISBN 978-0-8122-1705-6.
- Sims-Williams, Patrick (2007). "Common Celtic, Gallo-Brittonic and Insular Celtic". In Lambert, Pierre-Yves; Pinault, Georges-Jean (eds.). Gaulois et celtique continental. Librairie Droz. pp. 309–354. ISBN 978-2-600-01337-6.
- Tomlin, Roger (1987). "Was Ancient British Celtic ever a written language? Two texts from Roman Bath". Bulletin of the Board of Celtic Studies. 34: 18–25.
- Tomlin, Roger (1988). Tabellae Sulis: Roman Inscribed Tablets of Tin and Lead from the Sacred Spring at Bath. Oxford University Committee for Archaeology. ISBN 978-0-947816-00-1.
- Tomlin, Roger (2011). "Writing and Communication". In Allason-Jones, Lindsay (ed.). Artefacts in Roman Britain: Their Purpose and Use. Cambridge University Press. pp. 133–152. ISBN 978-0-521-86012-3.
- Uhalde, Kevin (2007). Expectations of Justice in the Age of Augustine. University of Pennsylvania Press. ISBN 978-0-8122-3987-4. JSTOR j.ctt3fhc5f.
- Wilson, Roger (1988). A Guide to the Roman Remains in Britain. Constable. ISBN 978-0-09-468680-9.
