= Claudia Severa =

Roman writer

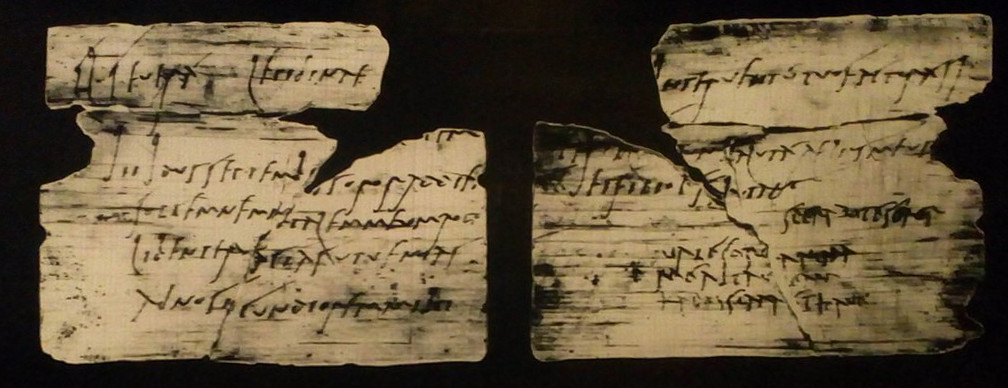
Possibly the earliest extant words written by a woman in Latin

Claudia Severa (born 11 September in first century, fl. 97–105) was a literate Roman woman, the wife of Aelius Brocchus, commander of an unidentified fort near Vindolanda fort in northern England. She is known for a birthday invitation she sent around 100 AD to Sulpicia Lepidina, wife of Flavius Cerialis, commander at Vindolanda. This invitation, written in ink on a thin wooden tablet, was discovered in the 1970s and is probably the best-known item of the Vindolanda Tablets.

The first part of the letter was written in formal style in a professional hand evidently by a scribe; the last four lines are added in a different handwriting, thought to be Claudia's own.

The translation is as follows:

Claudia Severa to her Lepidina greetings.

On 11 September, sister, for the day of the celebration of my birthday, I give you a warm invitation to make sure that you come to us, to make the day more enjoyable for me by your arrival, if you are present. Give my greetings to your Cerialis. My Aelius and my little son send him their greetings.

(2nd hand) I shall expect you, sister. Farewell, sister, my dearest soul, as I hope to prosper, and hail.

(Back, 1st hand) To Sulpicia Lepidina, (wife) of Cerialis, from Cl. Severa."

The Latin reads as follows:

Cl. Severá Lepidinae [suae] [sa]l[u]tem
iii Idus Septembres soror ad diem
sollemnem natalem meum rogó
libenter faciás ut venias
ad nos iucundiorem mihi

[diem] interventú tuo facturá si
aderis
Cerial[em t]uum salutá Aelius meus [...]
et filiolus salutant

sperabo te soror
vale soror anima
mea ita valeam
karissima et have

The Vindolanda Tablets also contain a fragment from another letter in Claudia's hand. These two letters are thought to be the oldest extant writing by a woman in Latin found in Britain, or perhaps anywhere. The letters show that correspondence between the two women was frequent and routine, and that they were in the habit of visiting one another, although it is not known at which fort Severa lived.

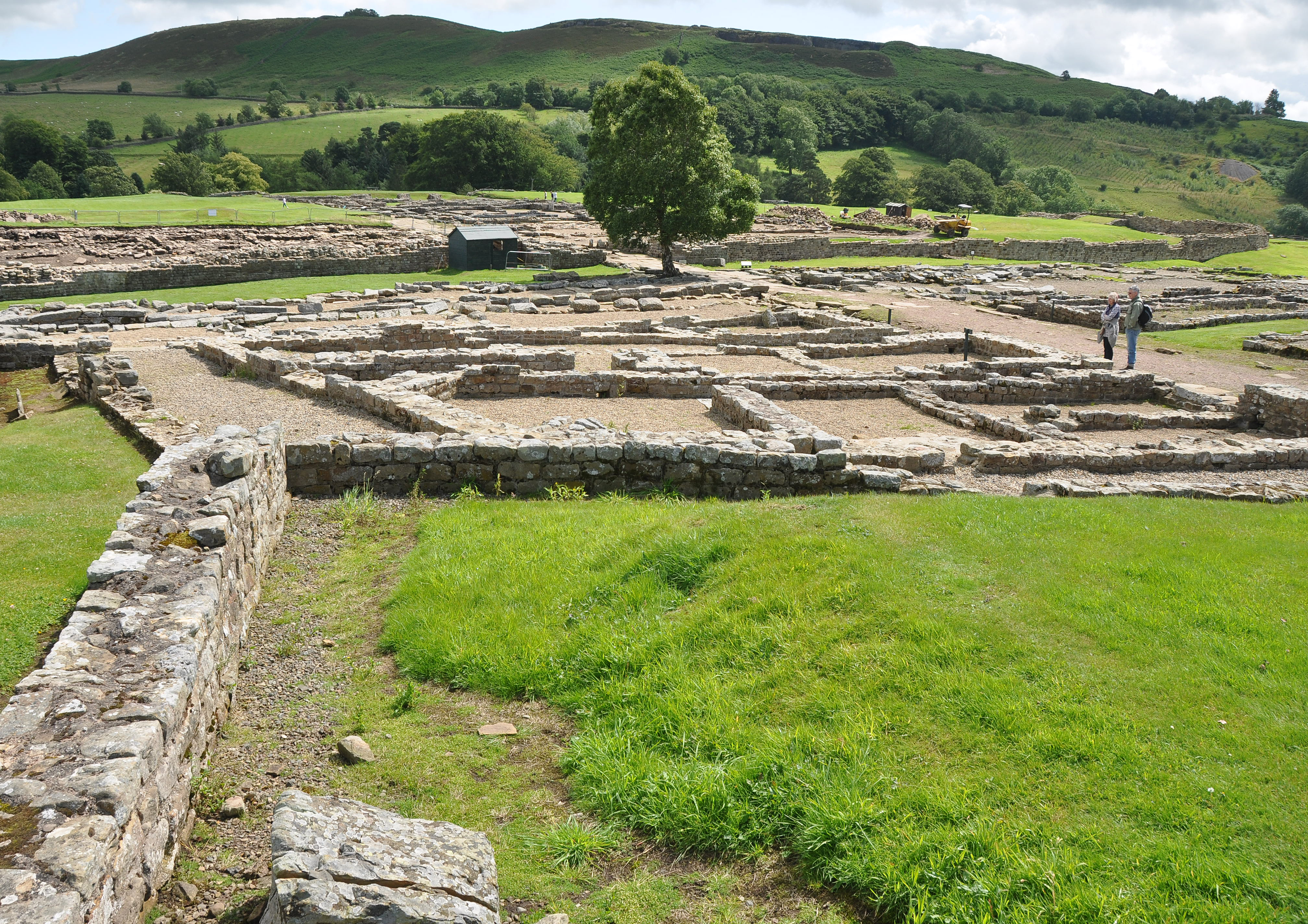
Remains of stone forts at Vindolanda

There are several aspects of Severa's letters that should be regarded as literary, even though they were not written for a wide readership. In particular, they share several thematic and stylistic features with other surviving writings in Latin by women from Greek and Roman antiquity. Although Severa's name reveals that she is unlikely to be related to Sulpicia Lepidina, she refers frequently to Lepidina as her sister, and uses the word iucundus to evoke a strong and sensual sense of the pleasure Lepidina's presence would bring, creating a sense of affection through her choice of language. In the post-script written in her own hand, she appears to draw on another Latin, literary model, from the fourth book of the Aeneid, in which at 4.8 Vergil characterises Anna as Dido's unanimam sororem, "sister sharing a soul", and at 4.31, she is "cherished more than life" (luce magis dilecta sorori). Although this is not proof that Severa and Lepidina were familiar with Virgil's writing, another letter in the archive, written between two men, directly quotes a line from the Aeneid, suggesting that the sentiments and language Sulpicia used do indeed draw on a Virgilian influence.

The Latin word that was chosen to describe the birthday festivities, sollemnis, is also noteworthy, as it means "ceremonial, solemn, performed in accordance with the forms of religion", and suggests that Severa has invited Lepidina to what was an important annual religious occasion.

== Display of letter ==
The invitation was acquired in 1986 by the British Museum, where it holds registration number 1986,1001.64. The museum has a selection of the Vindolanda Tablets on display, and loans some to the museum at Vindolanda.
