= Vindolanda tablets =

Roman writing tablets found in England

Writing-tablet
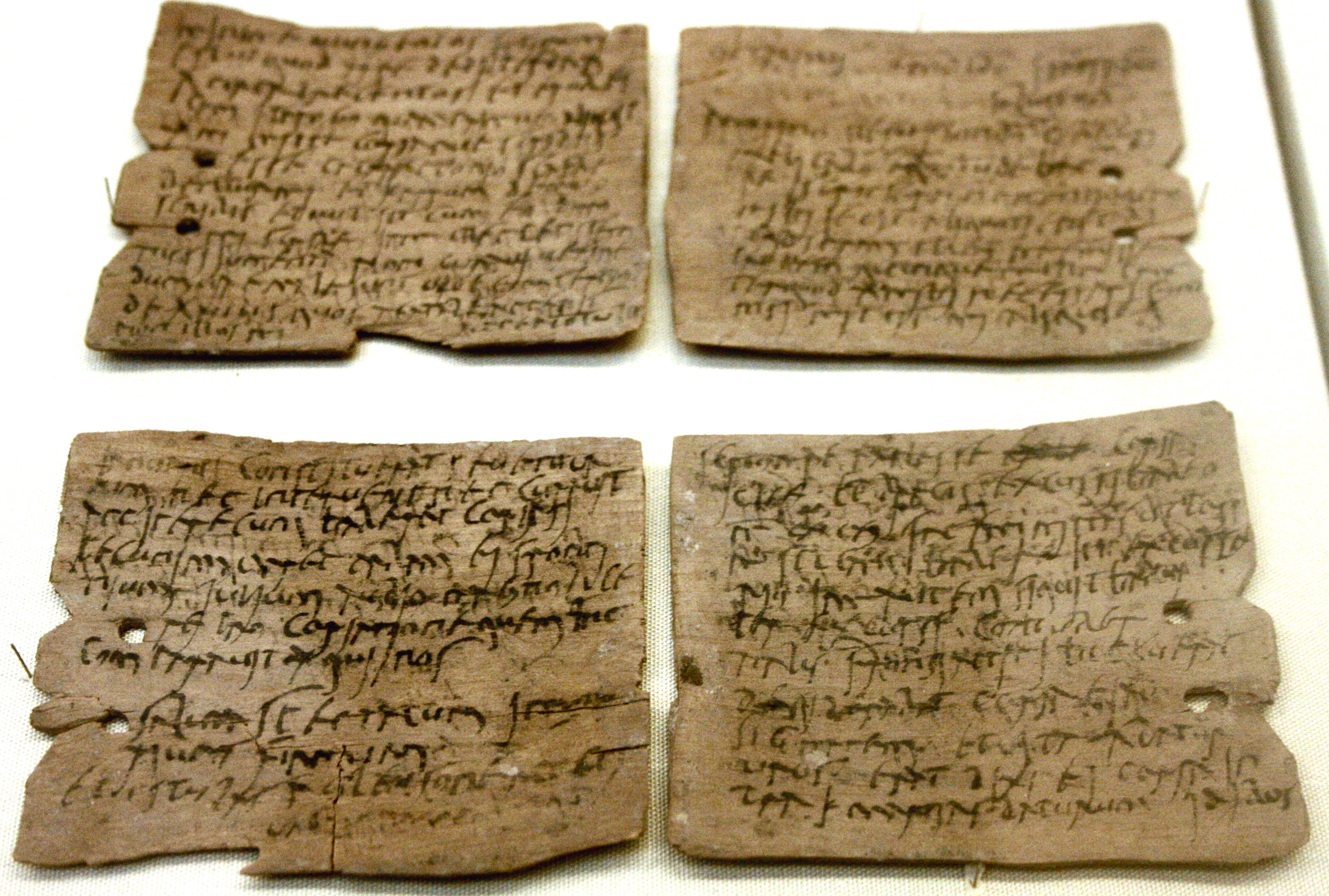
- Tablet 343: Letter from Octavius to Candidus concerning supplies of wheat, hides and sinews.
- Material: Birch; Alder; Oak
- Size: Length: 182 mm (7.2 in)
- Writing: Latin
- Created: late 1st to early 2nd century AD
- Period/culture: Romano-British
- Place: Vindolanda
- Present location: Room 49, British Museum, London
- Registration: 1989,0602.74

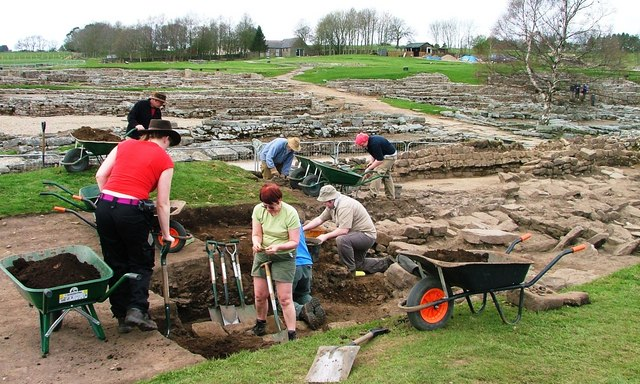
Archaeologists at work in Vindolanda, 2006

The Vindolanda tablets are some of the oldest surviving handwritten documents in Britain (antedated by the Bloomberg tablets from Roman London). They are a rich source of information about life on the northern frontier of Roman Britain. Written on fragments of thin, postcard-sized wooden leaf-tablets with carbon-based ink, the tablets date to the 1st and 2nd centuries AD (roughly contemporary with Hadrian's Wall). Although similar records on papyrus were known from elsewhere in the Roman Empire, wooden tablets with ink text had not been recovered until 1973, when archaeologist Robin Birley, his attention being drawn by student excavator Keith Liddell, discovered some at the site of Vindolanda, a Roman fort in northern England.

The documents record official military matters as well as personal messages to and from members of the garrison of Vindolanda, their families, and their slaves. Highlights of the tablets include an invitation to a birthday party held in about 100, which is perhaps the oldest surviving document written in Latin by a woman.

The excavated tablets are nearly all held at the British Museum, but arrangements have been made for some to be displayed at Vindolanda. As of 2023, more than 1,700 tablets have been discovered.

== Description ==
The wooden tablets found at Vindolanda were the first known surviving examples of the use of ink letters in the Roman period. The use of ink tablets was documented in contemporary records; Herodian in the 3rd century describes "a writing-tablet of the kind that were made from lime-wood, cut into thin sheets and folded face-to-face by being bent".

The Vindolanda tablets are made from birch, alder and oak that grew locally—in contrast to stylus tablets, another type of writing tablet used in Roman Britain, which were imported and made from non-native wood. The tablets are 0.25–3 mm (0.01–0.12 in) thick with a typical size being 20 cm × 8 cm (8 in × 3 in) (the size of a modern postcard). They were scored down the middle and folded to form diptychs with ink writing on the inner faces, the ink being carbon, gum arabic and water. Nearly 500 tablets were excavated in the 1970s and 1980s.

First discovered in March 1973, the tablets were initially thought to be wood shavings until one of the excavators found two stuck together and peeled them apart to discover writing on the inside. They were taken to the epigraphist Richard Wright, but rapid oxygenation of the wood meant that they were black and unreadable by the time he was able to view them. They were sent to Alison Rutherford at Newcastle University Medical School for multi-spectrum photography, which led to infrared photographs showing the scripts for researchers for the first time. The results were disappointing as the scripts were initially indecipherable. However, Alan Bowman at Manchester University and David Thomas at Durham University analysed the previously unknown form of cursive script and were able to produce transcriptions.

=== Chronology ===
Vindolanda fort was garrisoned before the construction of Hadrian's Wall, and most of the tablets are slightly older than the wall, which was begun in 122. The original director of excavations Robin Birley identified five periods of occupation and expansion:

1. c. 85–95, first fort constructed.
2. c. 95–100, fort enlargement.
3. c. 100–105, further fort enlargements.
4. c. 105–120, hiatus and reoccupation.
5. c. 120–130, the period when Hadrian's Wall was constructed

The tablets were produced in periods 2 and 3 (c. 95–105), with the majority written before 105. They were used for official notes about the Vindolanda camp business and personal affairs of the officers and households. The largest group is correspondence of Flavius Cerialis, prefect of the ninth cohort of Batavians and that of his wife, Sulpicia Lepidina. Some correspondence may relate to civilian traders and contractors; for example Octavian, the writer of Tablet 343, is an entrepreneur dealing in wheat, hides and sinews, but this does not prove him to be a civilian.

=== Transcription ===
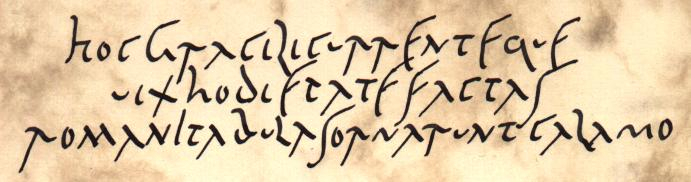
Illustration of Old Roman cursive script

The tablets are written in forms of Roman cursive script, considered to be the forerunner of joined-up writing, which varies in style by author. With few exceptions, they have been classified as old Roman cursive.

The cursive writing from Vindolanda differs greatly from the Latin capitals used for inscriptions. The script is derived from the capital writing of the late 1st century BC and the 1st century AD. The text rarely shows the unusual or distorted letter forms or the extravagant ligatures to be found in Greek papyri of the same period. Additional challenges for transcription are the use of abbreviations such as "h" for homines (men) or "cos" for consularis (consular), and the arbitrary division of words at the end of lines for space reasons such as "epistulas" (letters) being split between the "e" and the rest of the word.

The ink is often badly faded or survives as little more than a blur, so that in some instances transcription is not possible. In most cases infrared photographs of the tablets provide a far more legible version of what was written than visual inspection. However, the photographs contain marks which appear similar to writing but which certainly are not letters; additionally, they contain a great many lines, dots and other dark marks which may or may not be writing. Consequently, the published transcriptions have often had to be interpreted subjectively in deciding which marks should be regarded as writing.

=== Contents ===
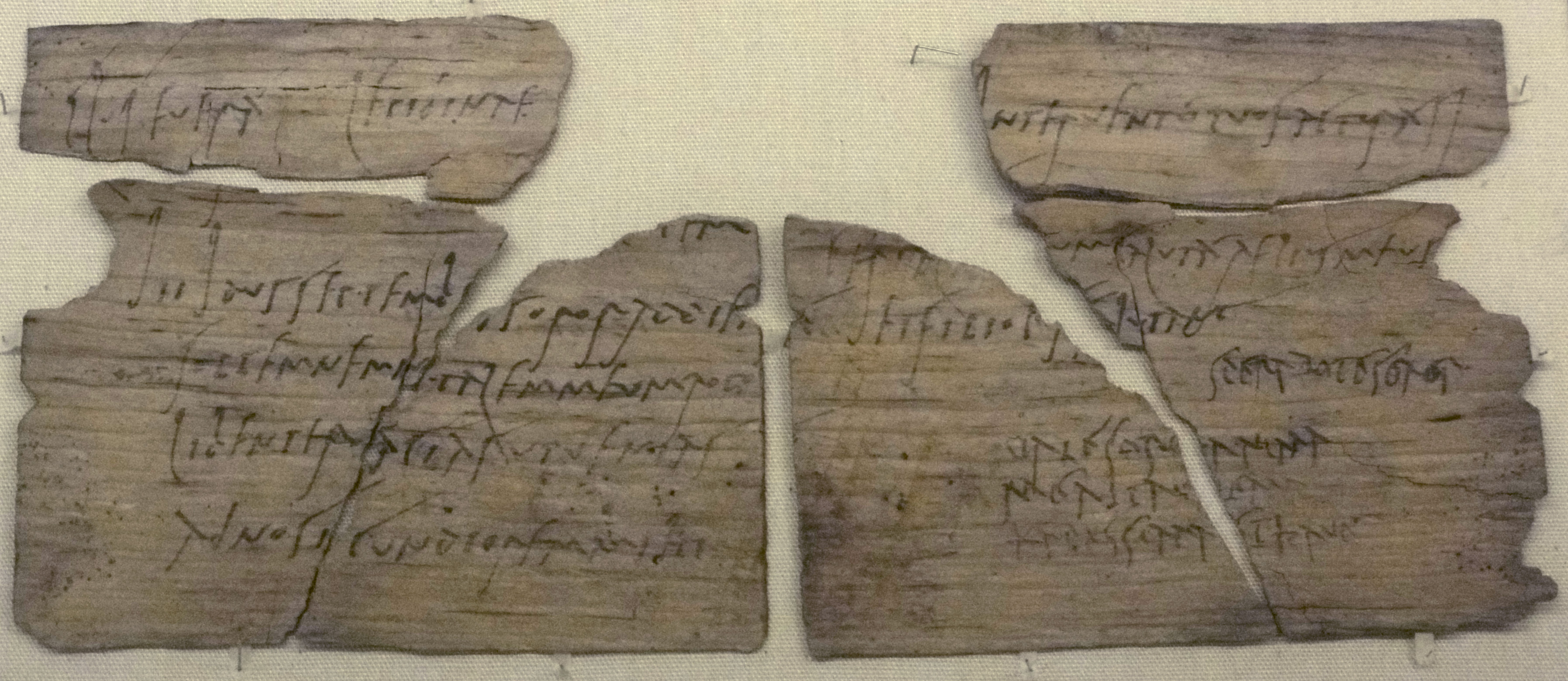
Invitation from Claudia Severa to Sulpicia Lepidina, ref Tab. Vindol. II 291

The tablets contain various letters of correspondence. For instance, the cavalry decurion Masculus wrote a letter to prefect Flavius Cerialis inquiring about the instructions for his men for the following day, including a polite request for more beer to be sent to the garrison (which had entirely consumed its previous stock of beer). The documents provide information about various roles performed by the men at the fort, such as a keeper of the bath-house, shoe-makers, construction workers, medical doctors, maintainers of wagons and kilns, and those put on plastering duty. One of the tablets confirms that Roman soldiers wore underpants (subligaculum), and also testifies to a high degree of literacy in the Roman army.

The best-known document is perhaps Tablet 291, written around 100 by Claudia Severa, the wife of the commander of a nearby fort, to Sulpicia Lepidina, inviting her to a birthday party. The invitation is one of the earliest known examples of writing in Latin by a woman. There are two handwriting styles in the tablet, with the majority of the text written in a professional hand (thought to be the household scribe) and with closing greetings personally added by Claudia Severa (on the lower right hand side of the tablet).

There are only scant references to the indigenous Celtic Britons. Until the discovery of the tablets, historians could only speculate on whether the Romans had a nickname for the Britons. Brittunculi (diminutive of Britto; hence 'little Britons'), found on one of the Vindolanda tablets, is now known to be a derogatory, or patronising, term used by the Roman garrisons that were based in Northern Britain to describe the locals.

== Comparison to other sites ==
Wooden tablets have been found at 20 Roman settlements in Britain. However, most of those sites did not yield the type of tablet found at Vindolanda, but rather "stylus tablets", marked with pointed metal styli. A significant number of ink tablets have been identified at Carlisle (also on Hadrian's Wall).

The fact that letters were sent to and from places on Hadrian's Wall and further afield (Catterick, York, and London) raises the question of why more letters have been found at Vindolanda than other sites, but it is not possible to give a definitive answer. The anaerobic conditions found at Vindolanda are not unique, and identical deposits have been found in parts of London. One possibility, given the fragile condition of the tablets found at Vindolanda, is that archaeologists excavating other Roman sites have overlooked evidence of writing in ink.

== Imaging ==
In 1973, the tablets were photographed by Susan M. Blackshaw in the British Museum, using infrared sensitive cameras and, more comprehensively, in 1990 at Vindolanda, by Alison Rutherford. The tablets were scanned again using improved techniques in 2000–2001 with a Kodak Wratten 87C infra-red filter. The photographs are taken in infrared to enhance the faded ink against the wood of the tablets, or to distinguish between ink and dirt, to make the writing more visible.

In 2002, the tablet images were used as part of a research programme to extend the use of the GRAVA iterative computer vision system, to aid the transcription of the Vindolanda tablets through a series of processes modelled on the best practice of papyrologists, and to provide the images in an XML marked up format, identifying the likely placement of characters and words with their transcription. In 2010, a collaboration between Centre for the Study of Ancient Documents at University of Oxford, the British Museum, and the Archaeological Computing Research Group at University of Southampton, used polynomial texture mapping on several hundreds of the original tablets for detailed recording and edge detection.

The images, at a resolution suitable for web page display, and text of the tablets from Tab. Vindol. II were published on-line. (Note: See Vindolanda Tablets Online. The digitization and online database project was a collaboration between the Centre for the Study of Ancient Documents and the Academic Computing Development Team at the University of Oxford with the support of the Andrew W. Mellon Foundation and the Arts and Humanities Research Board. The project directors were Alan Bowman, Charles Crowther and John Pearce. See http://vindolanda.csad.ox.ac.uk/about.shtml) Tablets from both Tab. Vindol. II and Tab. Vindol. III were published in 2010. (Note: See Vindolanda Tablets Online II. The Vindolanda Tablets were encoded with EpiDoc TEI (Text Encoding Initiative) for Centre for the Study of Ancient Documents at the University of Oxford as a part of the eSAD (e-Science and Ancient Documents) project. See)

== Exhibition and impact ==
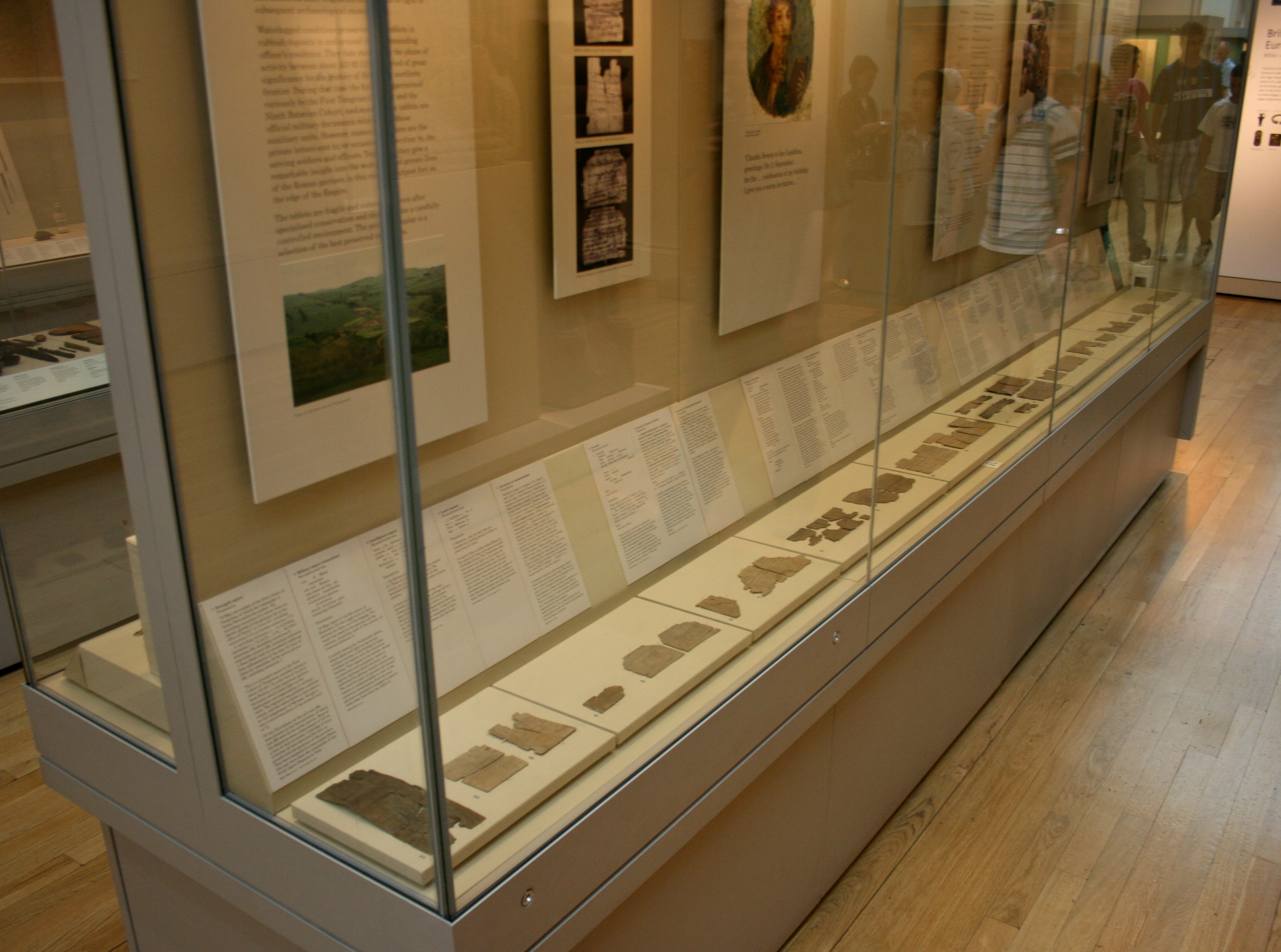
Tablets on display at the British Museum

The tablets are held at the British Museum, where a selection of them is on display in its Roman Britain gallery (Room 49). The tablets featured in the list of British archaeological finds selected by experts at the British Museum for the 2003 BBC Television documentary Our Top Ten Treasures. Viewers were invited to vote for their favourite, and the tablets came top of the poll.

The Vindolanda Museum, run by the Vindolanda Trust, has funding so that a selection of tablets on loan from the British Museum can be displayed at the site where they were found. The Vindolanda Museum put nine of the tablets on display in 2011. This loan of items to a regional museum is in line with British Museum's current policy of encouraging loans both internationally and nationally (as part of its Partnership UK scheme).

== See also ==
- Bath curse tablets
- Bloomberg tablets
- Shuihudi Qin bamboo texts

== Sources ==
- Birley, Anthony (2002). Garrison Life at Vindolanda. Stroud. ISBN 978-0-7524-1950-3.
- Birley, Robin (2005). Vindolanda: extraordinary records of daily life on the northern frontier. Roman Army Museum Publications. ISBN 978-1-873136-97-3.
- Bowman, Alan K; Thomas, J David (1974). The Vindolanda writing tablets. Northern history booklet, no. 47. Graham. ISBN 978-0-85983-096-6.
- Bowman, Alan K; Thomas, J David (1983). Vindolanda: The Latin Writing Tablets. Society for the Promotion of Roman Studies. ISBN 978-0-90776-402-1.
- Bowman, Alan K (1994a). Life and letters on the Roman frontier : Vindolanda and its people. British Museum Press. ISBN 978-0-7141-1389-0.
- Bowman, Alan K; Thomas, J David (1994b). The Vindolanda writing-tablets : (Tabulae Vindolandenses II). British Museum Press. ISBN 978-0-7141-2300-4.
- Bowman, Alan K; Thomas, J David (2003). The Vindolanda writing-tablets (Tabulae Vindolandenses III). British Museum Press. ISBN 978-0-7141-2249-6.
- Bowman, Alan K; Thomas, J David; Tomlin, R. S. O. (2010). "The Vindolanda Writing- Tablets (Tabulae Vindolandenses IV, Part 1)". Britannia. 41: 187–224. doi:10.1017/S0068113X10000176. S2CID 162953540.
