= Hotel Palmyra (Baalbek) =

Hotel in Baalbek, Lebanon

Coordinates: 34°00′12.62″N 36°12′16.10″E

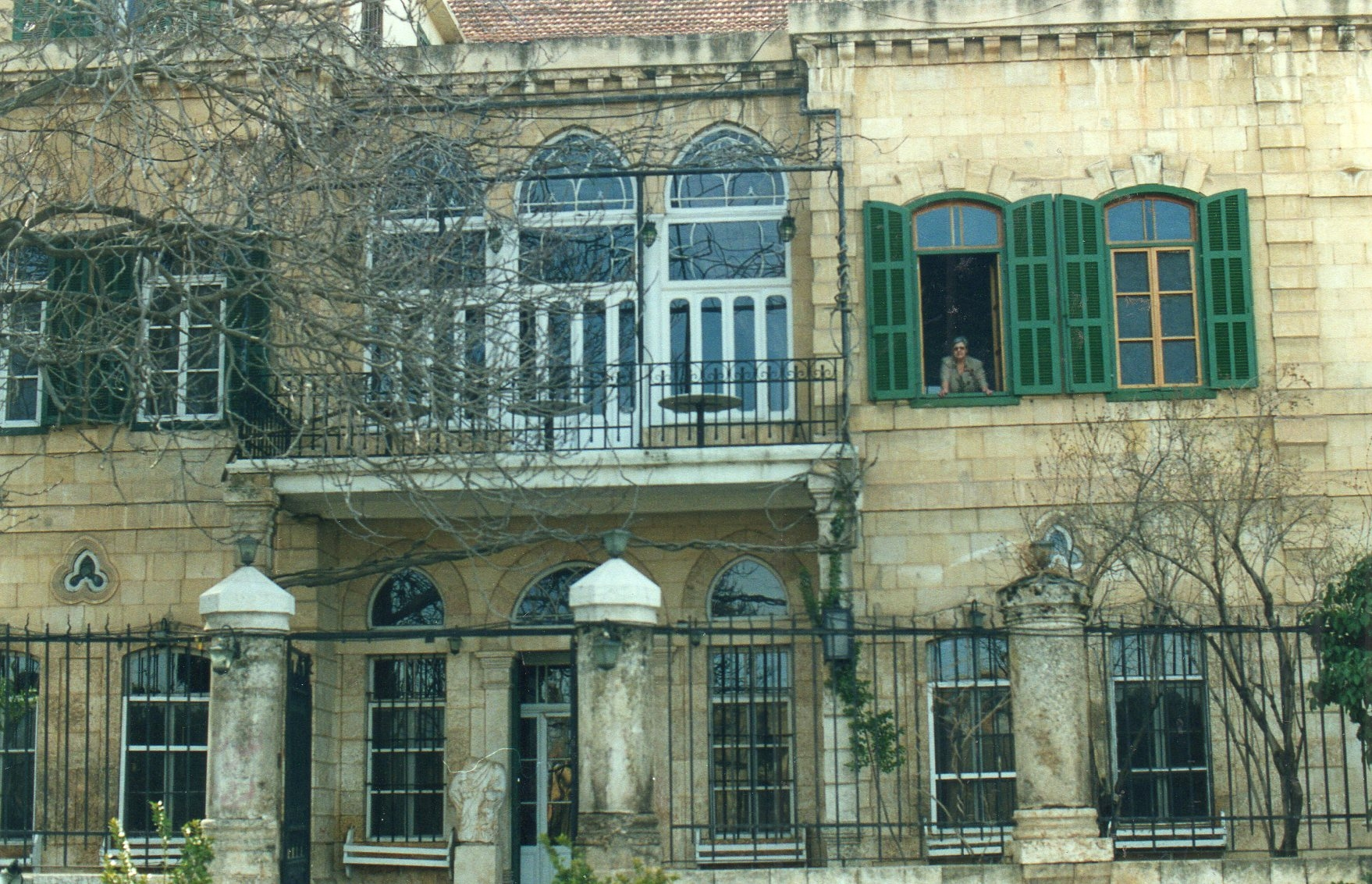
- Interactive map of the Hotel Palmyra area

General information
- Location: Baalbek, Lebanon
- Opening: 1878

Website
- Official hotel website

The Hotel Palmyra is a historic establishment in Baalbek, Lebanon. Located in front of the ancient Roman ruins, the hotel's interiors, with their antiquated mahogany furniture, relics from the Baalbek ruins and green ostrich skin lampshades, bear memories of a great past, when it hosted politicians and artists. The hotel features a diverse array of contemporary artworks and colourful tapestries adorning the walls as well as Persian carpets in its corridors. The hotel is known for its rich history.

== History ==
The hotel was built by a Greek businessman in 1874, who recognised the appeal of Baalbek's spectacular Roman ruins, which sit just across the road. The hotel has mixed fortunes. Within its walls, in 1920 the Declaration of the Greater Lebanon was signed, which established the boundaries of modern-day Lebanon.

In its heyday the hotel attracted royals and politicians, as well as writers, artists, performers and world-famous musicians. In this way, the hotel got a place of Lebanese collective memory. Today, it is a top destination for tourists and academics.

Ali Husseini bought the hotel in 1985; as of 2023 he and his wife, Rima Husseini, co-owned the hotel. Electricity shortages in Lebanon prompted the owners to install solar panels at the hotel in 2022. This was part of a growing tendency to install solar panels in Baalbek.

=== 2024 Israeli airstrike ===
On 6 of November 2024, during the 2024 Israeli invasion of Lebanon, an Israeli airstrike severely damaged the hotel. The stained-glass windows on its facade, a delicate lace of wood and glass, untouched since 1874, were all shattered.

== Notable guests ==
The Palmyra Hotel hosted international figures like German Emperor Wilhelm II, Charles de Gaulle, Mustafa Kemal Atatürk, Mohammad Reza Pahlavi, Albert Einstein, George Bernard Shaw, and even some legendary artists who graced the stage of the Baalbeck International Festival, notably Joan Baez, Ella Fitzgerald, Herbie Hancock, Umm Kulthum and Fairuz. In the corridors hang sketches and letters signed by Jean Cocteau after his two stays at the hotel in 1956 and 1960. The walls are also adorned with photographs of prominent figures who have stayed there.

== Gallery ==
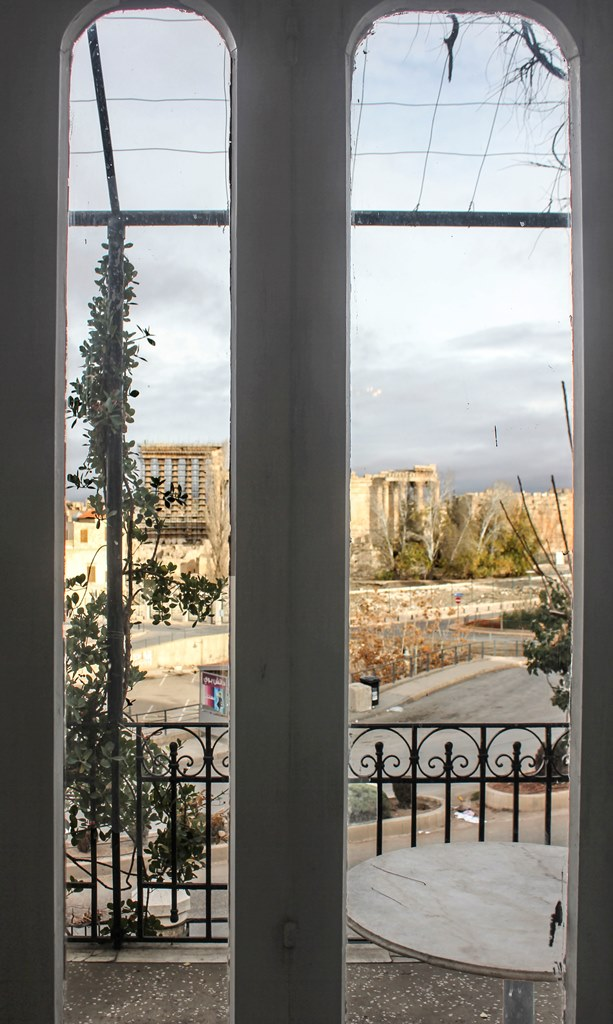
Look at the temples of Baalbek

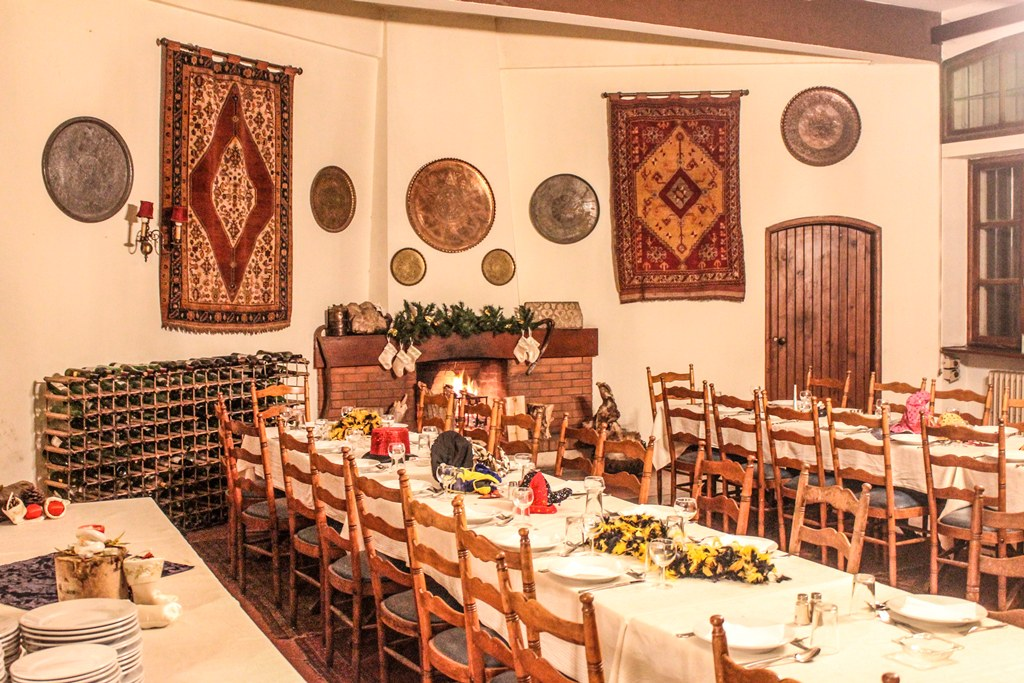
Dining room

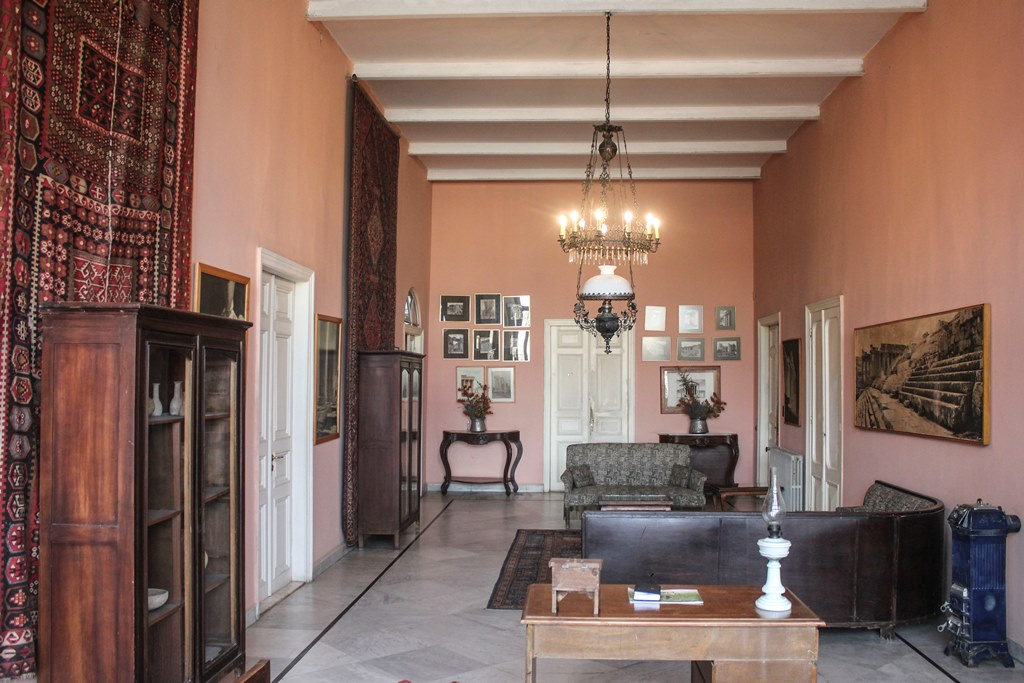
Lounge

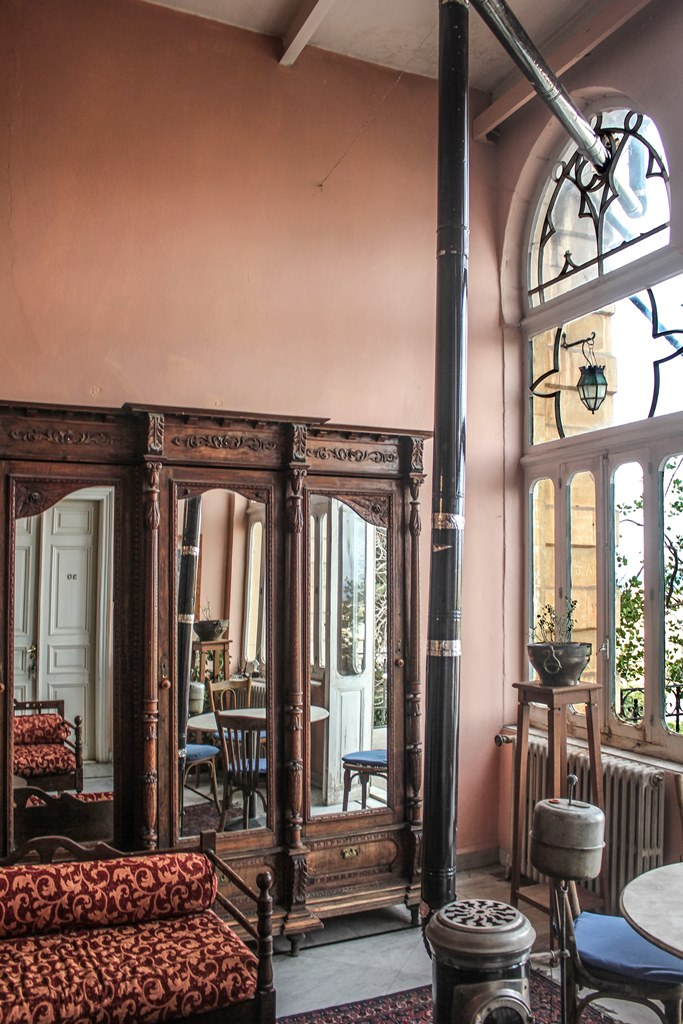
Ancient furniture

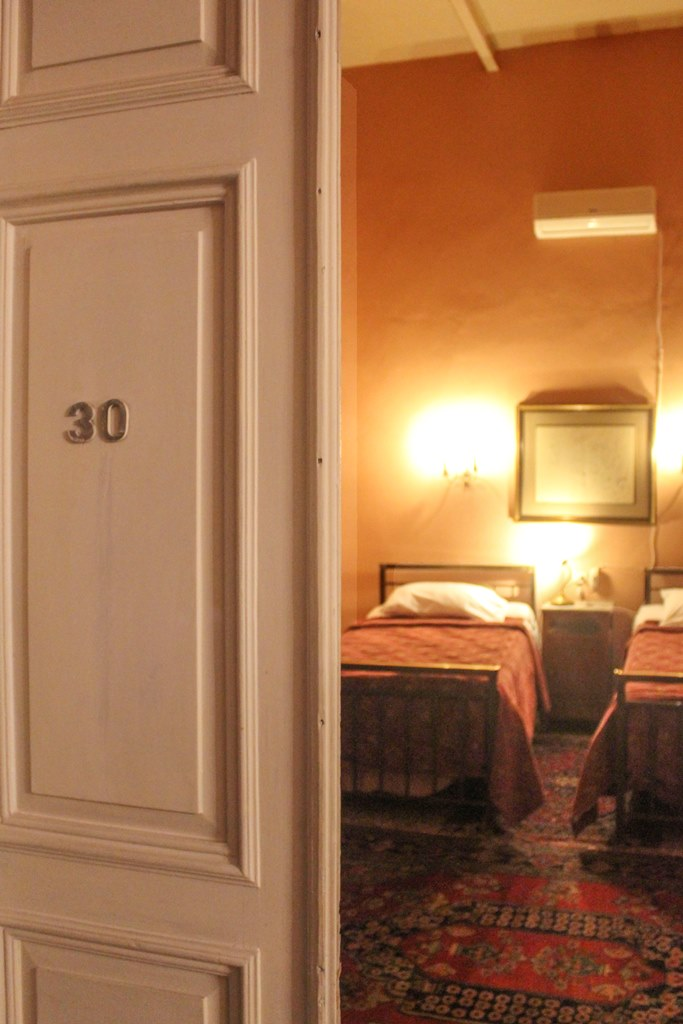
The room that once hosted Charles de Gaulle

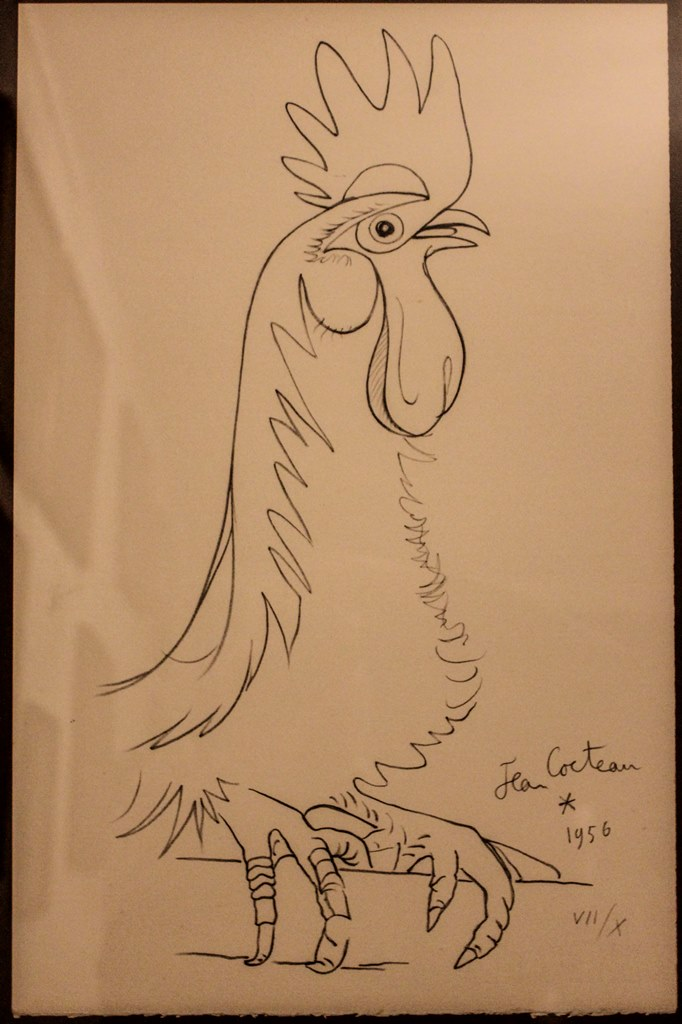
Drawing by Jean Cocteau
