= Rahme Haider =

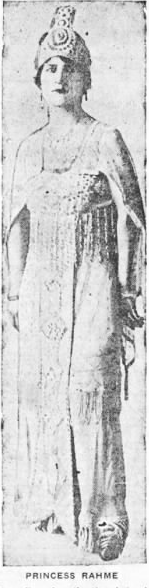
Rahme Haider in a 1917 publication.

Rahme Haider or Rahme Haidar (1880s – November 13, 1939), sometimes billed as "Princess" Rahme Haider, was an educator and lecturer based in Los Angeles, California.

== Early life ==
Rahme Haider was said to be from Baalbek, in the Mount Lebanon region. She attended a Presbyterian mission school in Sidon, and then Denison University in Ohio. Other accounts, including her death certificate, gave her hometown as Damascus, and her parents as Joseph Abou Haidar and Younise Abou Haidar. She was assigned as a missionary to Syrians in Los Angeles in 1909, by the Northern Baptist Convention.

== Career ==
Haider started a school for the children of Arabic speakers in Los Angeles. She also ran a Baptist Sunday school for children, and an evening school for young men and women, in the Syrian community there. With some backing from a local Syrian businessman, Phares Behanessey, she raised funds with a 1909 gala event in which Los Angeles society women, dressed in their "picturesque" interpretations of Middle Eastern attire, performed in a pageant.

After her mission commitment ended, Haider toured from the mid-1910s to the mid-1930s as "Princess Rahme" (a self-created royal), in the United States and Canada, giving lectures about Syrian history and culture to church and community groups. For many of her travels, she traveled with H. Lucille Burgess, who joined her in dramatic and musical portions of her presentation. Later in her career, she added a slide show and short film to her presentation. Haider and Burgess sometimes offered acting classes too, and directed local children in Biblical pageants while they were visiting a town for an extended run.

Rahme Haider's autobiography and travelogue, Under Syrian Stars, was published in 1929. In 1931 she declared her intention to seek American citizenship. One of her last publicized appearances was in Cortland, New York in January 1936.

== Personal life ==
Haidar and Burgess traveled and worked together for years; Burgess was usually described as Haidar's secretary, assistant, or companion. Rahme Haidar died in 1939, in Philadelphia, in her fifties.
