= Jean de la Roque =

French traveller and journalist

Jean de la Roque (French pronunciation: [ʒɑ̃ də la ʁɔk]; 1661 – December 8, 1745) was a French traveller and journalist born in Marseille, Province of Provence. He was the son of Pierre de la Roque, a merchant who his remembered for introducing coffee to Marseille in 1644, and the brother of Antoine de la Roque (1672-1744), a noted journalist whom he collaborated with on the magazine Mercure de France.

Jean de la Roque was the author of Voyage en Syrie et au mont Liban (1722), a book written about his experiences in the Levant, which he first visited in 1689. Here he describes the customs of the various regional tribes, and provides information on the ruins at Baalbek. In 1708-10 and 1711-13 he participated on two expeditions to the Arabian Peninsula, and afterwards published his Arabian experiences in a work called Voyage dans l’Arabie heureuse (1716). In this treatise he gives a highly descriptive and detailed account of coffee plantations and the coffee trade in Yemen.
