= Martin von Baumgarten =

German explorer

Martin von Baumgarten (Latin: Marinus à Baumgarten) was a German explorer who wrote the book Peregrinatio in Aegyptum, Arabiam, Palaestinam, & Syriam, published in 1594. It was the first modern account of the ruins at Baalbek and was mentioned by John Locke.
