= Robert Richardson (travel writer) =

Dr Robert Richardson FRSE (1779–5 November 1847) was an early 19th-century Scottish physician remembered as a travel writer.

== Life ==
He was born in Stirlingshire in 1779. He was educated at Stirling High School then studied medicine at the University of Glasgow. He gained his doctorate (MD) from the University of Edinburgh in 1807. After spending some years as a general practitioner in Dumfriesshire he became travelling companion and personal physician to Charles John Gardiner, 1st Earl of Blessington (Viscount Mountjoy). In 1816 they were further joined by Somerset Lowry-Corry, 2nd Earl Belmore. The three then spent two years travelling Europe, Egypt and Palestine.

Whilst in Albania they met Ali Pasha at Janina. Later in Palestine, Richardson claimed to be the first Christian visitor to Solomon's mosque in Gaza. In Tiberias they met Lady Hester Lucy Stanhope.

He returned to Britain in the summer of 1815, settling in Rathbone Place in London.

In 1818 he was elected a Fellow of the Royal Society of Edinburgh for his contributions to geology. His proposers were Sir James Hall, Henry Mackenzie, and Lt Col Patrick Tytler.

He died at home at Gordon Street off Gordon Square in London on 5 November 1847 and is buried on the western side of Highgate Cemetery in an unmarked grave (no.2449).

== Publications ==
- Richardson, R. (1822). Travels Along the Mediterranean and Parts Adjacent, In Company with the Earl of Belmore, During the Years 1816-17-18, Extending as Far as the Second Cataract of the Nile, Jerusalem, Damascus, Balbec &c. &c. Vol. 1. London/Edinburgh: T. Cadell/W. Blackwood.
- Richardson, R. (1822). Travels Along the Mediterranean and Parts Adjacent, In Company with the Earl of Belmore, During the Years 1816-17-18, Extending as Far as the Second Cataract of the Nile, Jerusalem, Damascus, Balbec &c. &c. Vol. 2. London/Edinburgh: T. Cadell/W. Blackwood.
