= Charles G. Addison =

English barrister and historical, travel and legal writer

Charles Greenstreet Addison (1 April 1812 – 19 February 1866) was an English barrister and historical, travel and legal writer.

== Biography ==
Addison was born in Maidstone, Kent, the son of William Dering Addison and Susanna Brown Addison. He had an elder brother of the same name (born 1807) who died before he was born. He was called to the bar on 10 June 1842 by the Inner Temple, joined the home circuit and Kent sessions; he was a revising barrister for Kent. In 1848 he married Frances Octavia, twelfth child of the Honourable James Wolfe Murray, Lord Cringletie, by whom he left seven children.

== Works ==
In 1838 he published Damascus and Palmyra, describing a journey in the Middle East. He then wrote a History of the Knights Templar, the first two editions of which appeared in 1842 and a third in 1852. In 1843 he published another historical work on the Temple Church. He was best known as the author of two legal text-books, a Treatise on the Law of Contracts, 1845, and Wrongs and their Remedies, a Treatise on the Law of Torts, 1860, which went through several editions in the UK and US.
