= William Bodham Donne =

English journalist

William Bodham Donne (1807–1882) was an English journalist, known also as a librarian and theatrical censor.

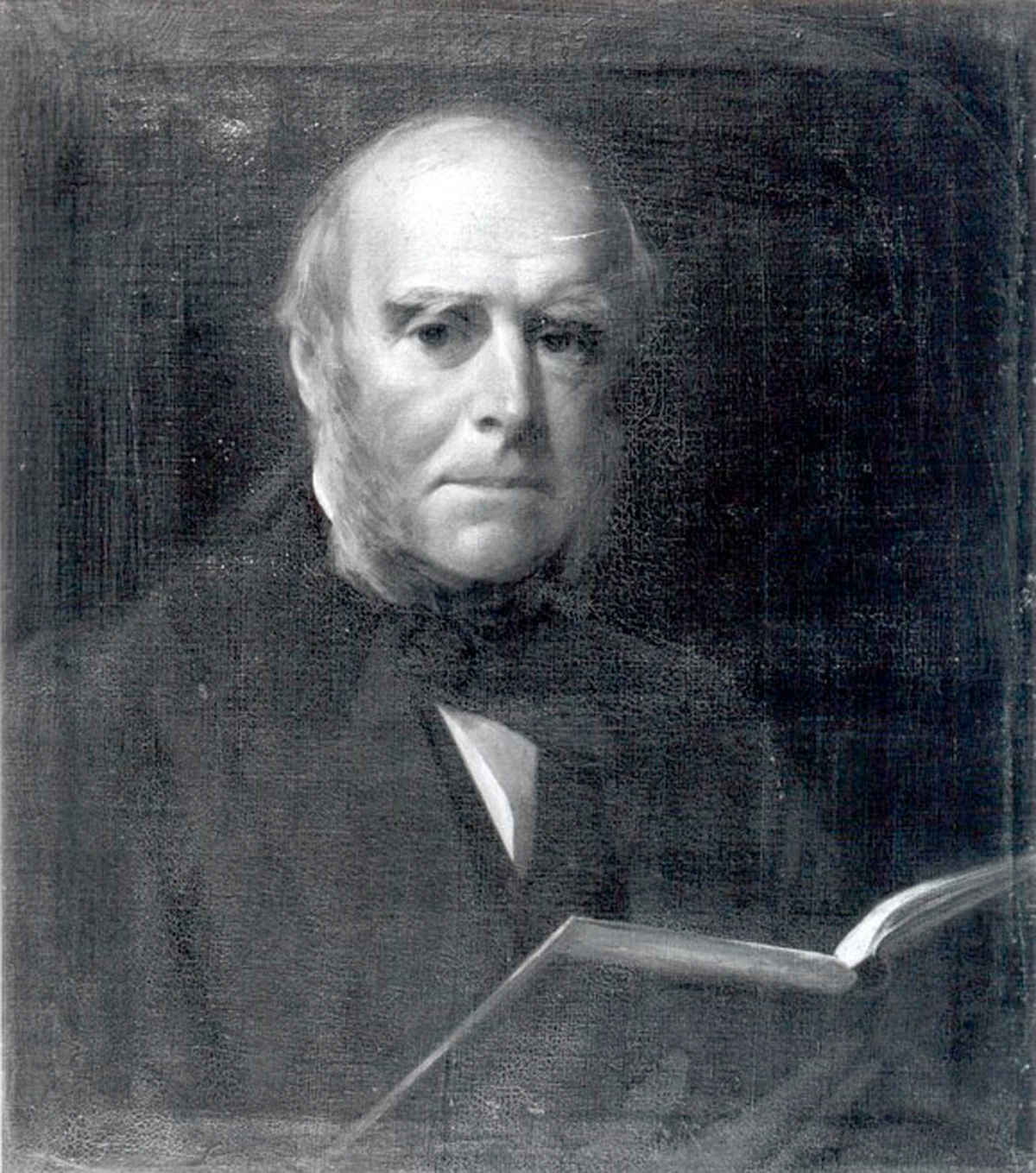
William Bodham Donne

== Early life and career ==
Donne was born 29 July 1807; his grandfather was an eminent surgeon in Norwich. His father Edward Charles Donne, of Mattishall Hall, was also a medical practitioner. He was educated at Bury St Edmunds Grammar School, taught for two years by Benjamin Heath Malkin. There he formed lasting friendships with James Spedding, Edward FitzGerald, and John Mitchell Kemble, the Anglo-Saxon scholar. His friendship in after life with the Kemble family helped to turn his attention to the drama. He went to Caius College, Cambridge, but scruples against taking the religious tests then required prevented him from graduating. He was a Cambridge Apostle, and a member of the Sterling Club.

After he left Cambridge, the choice of a career proved troublesome for Donne; and he hardly solved the problem, well connected as he was. He asked friends to find him literary work. He spent time at Mattishall in Norfolk, on Anne Bodham's estate; she was his great-aunt, and a cousin of William Cowper. There he married, and took up periodical journalism. In 1846 he moved to Bury St. Edmunds, for the sake of the education of his sons, and came to know John William Donaldson, then head-master of the school. Other friends were William Taylor, Henry Crabb Robinson, Bernard Barton, Thomas Manning, and George Borrow. He was one of the founding members of the Bury and West Suffolk Archaeological Institute, attending their first meeting in 1848.

== Examiner of Plays ==
In 1852 Donne declined the editorship of the Edinburgh Review, but the same year he accepted the librarianship of the London Library. In 1857 he resigned to become Examiner of Plays, in succession to his friend Kemble, a post in the Lord Chamberlain's Office, where he had previously acted as Kemble's deputy. He held the position till 1874, when he was succeeded by E. F. S. Pigott.

From 1865 the Examiner of Plays, in company with the Inspector of Theatres (an appointed architect) began to visit backstage areas, which were found in some cases to be nasty and insanitary. Donne gave evidence in 1866 to a parliamentary committee, on his duties in the Lord Chamberlain's Office. They included inspection of the physical premises of theatres, and enforcement of building improvements. Seven plays had been refused a licence since 1857, a decision taken at the level of Lord Chamberlain. Plays of Jack Sheppard and Oliver Twist had been closed while running.

As a censor, Donne was openly hostile to French drama and its influence. His approach was later criticised (in 1886) by William Archer, who found it "alternately tyrannical and futile". The parliamentary enquiry in fact supported the line taken in censorship at the time, and suggested it might be extended. Archer claimed that John Hollingshead and Tom Taylor as witnesses had dissented; but they did not oppose censorship as such.

One of the firm lines Donne took was against stage representation of Bible stories, and discussion of theology. He defended, to the parliamentary enquiry, the permission granted to perform certain operas, considered "unsuitable", on the grounds that the words were not very audible, and in a foreign language. It has been found surprising that he did not object to the song The Wearing of the Green, in a Dion Boucicault play set during the Irish Rebellion of 1798. In fact Donne cited the play, Arrah-na-Pogue, in a short list of contemporary works he thought were likely to last, along with others by Edward Bulwer, Sheridan Knowles, John Westland Marston, Thomas Noon Talfourd, and Tom Taylor.

Donne licensed in the range of 5,000 to 6,000 plays while in post. He kept careful records of the blue pencil, showing passages excised as a condition of licensing. These are extant.

== Death and views ==
Donne died on 20 June 1882. He was a liberal in politics, supported the repeal of the corn laws, and spoke on behalf of Lajos Kossuth.

== Works ==
Donne's writings were mainly in the periodicals of the day. He became a contributor to the leading reviews, including the Edinburgh Review, Quarterly Review, Fraser's Magazine, and the British and Foreign Review, of which Kemble was editor. He was a frequent contributor to the Saturday Review. He also wrote some articles in Bentley's Quarterly Review (1859–60), when it was edited by Robert Cecil.

A classical scholar, Donne published in 1852 Old Roads and New Roads, involving classical literature and modern history. His Essays on the Drama, collected from periodicals, were published in 1858, and reached a second edition in 1863. He wrote the volumes Euripides and Tacitus for the series Ancient Classics for English Readers (William Blackwood and Sons). As a theatre critic, Donne expressed reservation about contemporary trends, in the direction of historical accuracy, and towards concrete representation rather than relying on imagination.

In 1867 Donne edited the Letters of George III to Lord North. Other works were contributions to William Smith's classical dictionaries, such as Smith's A Dictionary of Greek and Roman Geography, and selections from classical writers for John Weale.

== Family ==
Donne on 15 November 1830 married Catharine Hewitt, daughter of Charles Hewitt who was an attorney in Norwich, and on her mother' side niece of John Johnson, Cowper's relation. Their eldest son, Charles Edward Donne, became vicar of Faversham, Kent, and married first, Mildred, daughter of John Mitchell Kemble; secondly, Augusta, daughter of W. Rigden of Faversham. The other children were William Mowbray and Frederick Church (a major in the army), and three daughters.
