= Baalath =

Baalath is the name of either one or two towns in the Hebrew Bible. Its name is the female form of Baal.

Joshua 19:44 lists Baalath among Danite towns in the territory of the tribe of Dan. According to 1 Kings 9:17-19, Solomon either built or rebuilt several cities, including one named Baalath.

== Externals ==
- Joshua 19:44
- 1 Kings 9:18
- 2 Chronicles 8:6
