= Picturesque Europe =

Book series

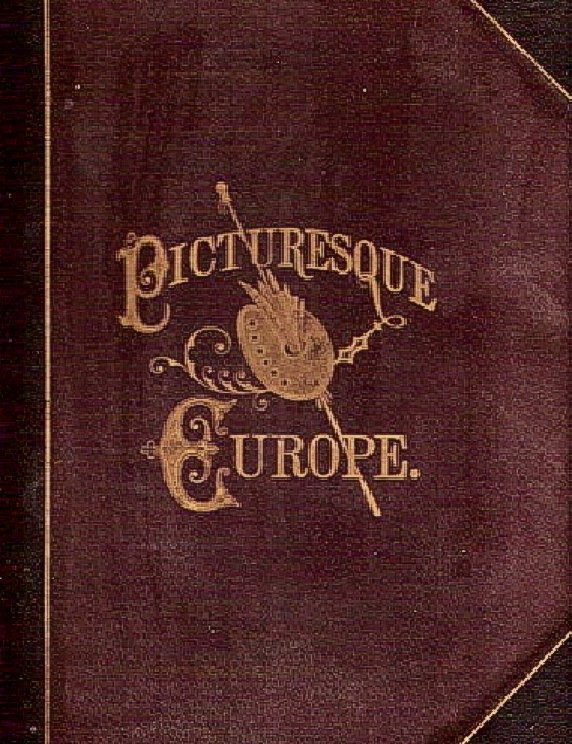
The cover of one of the Cassell editions

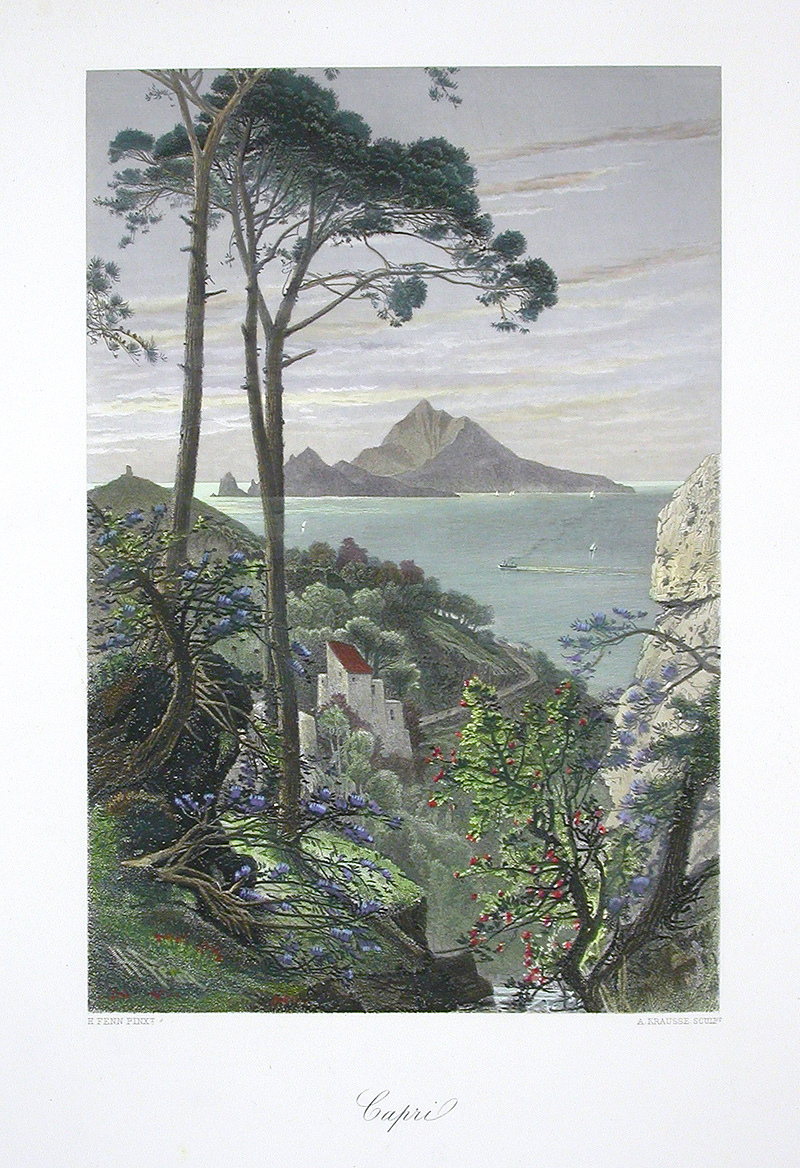
Capri by Harry Fenn

Picturesque Europe was a lavishly illustrated set of books published by D. Appleton & Co. in the mid-1870s based on their phenomenally successful Picturesque America. An edited form was reprinted in Europe by Cassell & Co. The books depicted nature and tourist haunts in Europe, with text descriptions and numerous steel and wood engravings. J.W. Whymper was among the engravers and directed the other artists on the project.

== Contents ==
=== Volume One ===
Volume One covered the British Isles, with unattributed articles on "Windsor"; "Eton"; "North Wales"; "Warwick and Stratford"; "The South Coast, from Margate to Portsmouth"; "The Forest Scenery of Great Britain"; "The Dales of Derbyshire"; "Edinburgh, and the South Lowlands"; "Ireland"; "Scenery of the Thames"; "The South Coast, from Portsmouth to the Lizard"; "English Abbeys and Churches"; "The Land's End"; "Old English Homes"; "The West Coast of Ireland"; "Border Castles and Counties"; "Cathedral Cities"; "The Grampians"; "Oxford"; "Scotland, from Loch Ness to Loch Eil"; "The West Coast of Wales"; and "The Lake Country". (Note: Volumes I and II of the Cassell editions, which have identical text, credit these sections to T.G. Bonney; Oscar Browning; T.G. Bonney; T.G. Bonney; H.H.S. Pearse; W. Senior; T.G. Bonney; Jason Grant; John Francis Waller; W. Senior; T.G. Bonney; T.G. Bonney; T.G. Bonney; H. Schütz Wilson; John Francis Waller; James Grant; T.G. Bonney; James Grant; Richard John King; James Grant; H. Schütz Wilson; and T.G. Bonney, respectively.) These sections were illustrated with wood engravings of the drawings and paintings of W.H.J. Boot, C. Emery, Harry Fenn, Towneley Green, J. Harmsworth, C. Johnson, W.L. Jones, R.P. Leitch, W.W. May, J. North, T.L. Rowbotham, T.D. Scott, E. Senior, P. Skelton, C.J. Staniland, E. Wagner, and E.M. Wimperis and with a few steel engravings of the drawings and paintings of J. Chase, Harry Fenn, Birket Foster, D. McKewan, W. Leitch, J. Mogford, S. Read, P. Skelton, and E.M. Wimperis.

=== Volume Two ===
Volume II covered more of Britain, as well as the Channel Islands and the Continent, with unattributed articles on "Cambridge"; "The South Coast of Devonshire"; "South Wales"; "North Devon"; "The Isle of Wight"; "Normandy and Brittany"; "The Italian Lakes"; "The Passes of the Alps"; "The Cornice Road"; "The Forest of Fontainebleau"; "The Rhine"; "Venice"; "The Channel Islands"; "The Pyrenees"; "Rome and its Environs"; "The Bernese Oberland"; "The Rhine (from Boppart to the Drachenfels)"; "Spain (The North and Old Castile)"; "Auvergne and Dauphiné"; "Old German Towns"; and "Naples". (Note: Volumes II, III, & IV of the Cassell editions, which have identical text, credit these sections to T.G. Bonney; Richard John King; H. Schütz Wilson; Richard John King; H.H.S. Pearse; Godfrey Wordsworth Turner; T.W. Hinchliff; T.G. Bonney; Oscar Browning; Godfrey Wordsworth Turner; R.J. King; T.G. Bonney; W.H. Rideing; A. Griffiths; T.G. Bonney; T.G. Bonney; R.J. King; A. Griffiths; T.G. Bonney; Oscar Browning; and T.G. Bonney, respectively.) These sections were illustrated with wood engravings of the drawings and paintings of W.H.J. Boot, C. Emery, Harry Fenn, Cyrus Johnson, R.P. Leitch, W.W. May, T. Macquoid, T.L. Rowbotham, E. Senior, P. Skelton, J.D. Woodward, C. Whymper, and J. Wolf and with a few steel engravings of the drawings and paintings of S. Cook, Harry Fenn, Birket Foster, Louis Haghe, S.H. Hodson, G.G. Kilburne, T.L. Rowbotham, J.B. Smith, C. Werner, E.M. Wimperis, and L.J. Wood.

=== Volume Three ===
Volume III covered other parts of Europe: unattributed articles describe "Norway"; "Spain (New Castile and Extremadura)"; "The Lake of Geneva"; "The Frontiers of France (East and South)"; "North Italy"; "Norway (The Sogne Fjord, Nord Fjord, Romsdal)"; "Spain (Córdoba, Seville, and Cádiz)"; "The Frontiers of France (West and North)"; "Calabria and Sicily"; "The Black Forest"; "Sweden"; "The Tyrol"; "Gibraltar and Ronda"; "Dresden and the Saxon Switzerland"; "Eastern Switzerland"; "Constantinople"; "Belgium"; "The High Alps"; "Granada and the East Coast of Spain"; "Russia"; "The Jura"; "Athens and its Environs"; "Holland"; and "The Danube". (Note: Volumes IV and V of the Cassell editions, which have identical text, credit these sections to W. Mattieu Williams; Arthur Griffiths; T.W. Hinchliff; T.G. Bonney; T.G. Bonney; W. Mattieu Williams; Arthur Griffiths; Godfrey Wordsworth Turner; W. Mattieu Williams; George Adam Smith; Arthur Griffiths; T.G. Bonney; Arthur Griffiths; George Adam Smith; Arthur Griffiths; Percy Fitzgerald; T.G. Bonney; Arthur Griffiths; W.R.S. Ralston; G.F. Browne; W. Mattieu Williams; George Adam Smith; and George Adam Smith, respectively.) These sections were illustrated with wood engravings of the drawings and paintings of W.H.J. Boot, E. Compton, Harry Fenn, W. Herbert, R.P. Leitch, E. Senior, P. Skelton, C.J. Staniland, J. Williams, and J.D. Woodward and with a few steel engravings of the drawings and paintings of E. Compton, Harry Fenn, Birket Foster, E. George, S. Hodson, G.G. Kilburne, W. Simpson, Carl Werner, L.J. Wood, and J.D. Woodward.

== See also ==
- Picturesque America
- Picturesque Palestine, Sinai, and Egypt
- Grand Tour
