= Richard Cowley Powles =

English cleric, academic and founding headmaster of Wixenford School

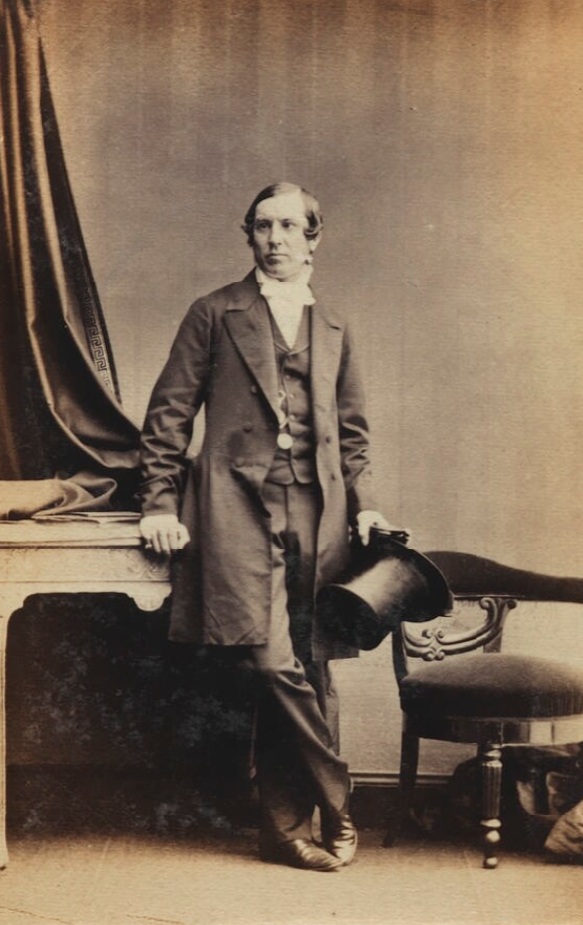
Richard Cowley Powles, 1861 photograph

Richard Cowley Powles (1819–1901), often known as Cowley Powles, was an English cleric, academic and founding headmaster of Wixenford School.

== Early life ==
He was the son of John Diston Powles, and was educated at Helston Grammar School under Derwent Coleridge. There he met Charles Kingsley, a friend for life. Another friend from Helston was Charles Alexander Johns, who gave him instruction as a naturalist.

Kingsley and Powles both moved on to King's College, London for a time. Powles matriculated at Exeter College, Oxford in 1838. He became a Fellow of the college in 1842, graduating B.A. in 1845 and M.A. in 1846.

== Oxford in the 1840s ==
Exeter College had an Essay Club in 1839–40, in which Powles and Richard John King took part, Powles being President. Powles was President of the Oxford Union in the Hilary term of 1841. He was ordained deacon in 1843. A witness of most of the course of the Oxford Movement, he gave Sidney Leslie Ollard an anecdotal story about John Henry Newman and ritual: alleging that the Tractarian use of the mixed chalice was explained by their severe fasting.

In Oxford, a literary and intellectual group arose in the 1840s, to which Powles belonged. It grew around the Oxford and Cambridge Review, and comprised also George Butler, Arthur Hugh Clough, and James Anthony Froude. The Review is now identified with the periodicals advocating "Tory paternalism". Powles was one of the Oxford supporters, Kingsley and F. D. Maurice too supported as Cambridge graduates.

Froude was another close personal friend. He wrote to Powles, complaining of Kingsley's "Chartist" views. Powles collected Kingsley's poems, about which the author was careless.

Another friend from this period was John Duke Coleridge. He considered Powles one of his two closest friends.

== Later life ==
See also Wixenford School

On leaving Oxford in 1850, to marry, Powles ran a school, first in Blackheath. This he purchased from George Brown Francis Potticary, an Oxford contemporary who in that year became rector of Girton, Cambridgeshire. Potticary had had the school, at 9 Eliot Place, since 1831. Powles moved it in 1865, as "St Neot's Preparatory School", to Wixenford House, in Kingsley's parish of Eversley. The Eliot Place school, set up in 1805 by John Potticary, was also the origin of St Piran's, later in Maidenhead, where it was moved by Thomas Nunns around 1872, who had bought the school from Powles. The Blackheath school continued under George Valentine.

One of his Wixenford pupils, Albert Victor Baillie, called Powles "a genuine educator and a remarkable man", going on to describe his hairstyle, brushed up into two horns over his ears.

Kingsley died in 1875. Powles left his school in 1880. He became a prebendary of Chichester Cathedral, where John Burgon, an old friend, was the Dean. The school was taken over by Ernest Penrose Arnold, an Oxford graduate in 1874; and it moved to Wokingham.

== Works ==
Powles edited Sermons Preached at St. John's Chapel, St. John's Wood, by the Late Rev. Percy Lousada (1860). Percy Martin(g)dale Lousada (c.1823–1859) was an Anglican cleric and photographer.

== Family ==
Powles married in 1850 Mary Chester, daughter of George Chester.
