= Victor Guérin =

French archaeologist, geographer and explorer of Palestine, Greece and North Africa

- Born: September 15, 1821; Paris, Kingdom of France
- Died: September 21, 1891 (aged 70); Paris, France

Victor Guérin (French pronunciation: [viktɔʁ ɡeʁɛ̃]; 15 September 1821 – 21 September 1890) was a French intellectual, explorer and amateur archaeologist. He published books describing the geography, archeology and history of the areas he explored, which included Greece, Asia Minor, North Africa, Lebanon, Syria and Palestine.

== Biography ==
Victor Guérin, a devout Catholic, graduated from the École normale supérieure in Paris in 1840. After graduation, he began working as a teacher of rhetoric and member of faculty in various colleges and high schools in France, then in Algeria in 1850, and 1852 he became a member of the French School of Athens. While exploring Samos, he identified the spring that feeds the Tunnel of Eupalinos and the beginnings of the channel. His doctoral thesis of 1856 dealt with the coastal region of Palestine, from Khan Yunis to Mount Carmel.

Guerin died on 21 September 1891 in Paris.

== Academic and archaeology career ==
He was a professor of foreign literature in Lyon and Grenoble. In 1878 he joined the faculty of the Institut Catholique de Paris. He was a member of the Société des Antiquaires de France from 1862, and of the Légion d'honneur from 1866.

With the financial backing of Honoré Théodoric d'Albert de Luynes he explored Greece, the Greek Islands, Asia Minor, Egypt, Nubia, Tunisia, and the Levant. He published many unknown Punic and Roman inscriptions from Tunisia, as well as a detailed map of the country.

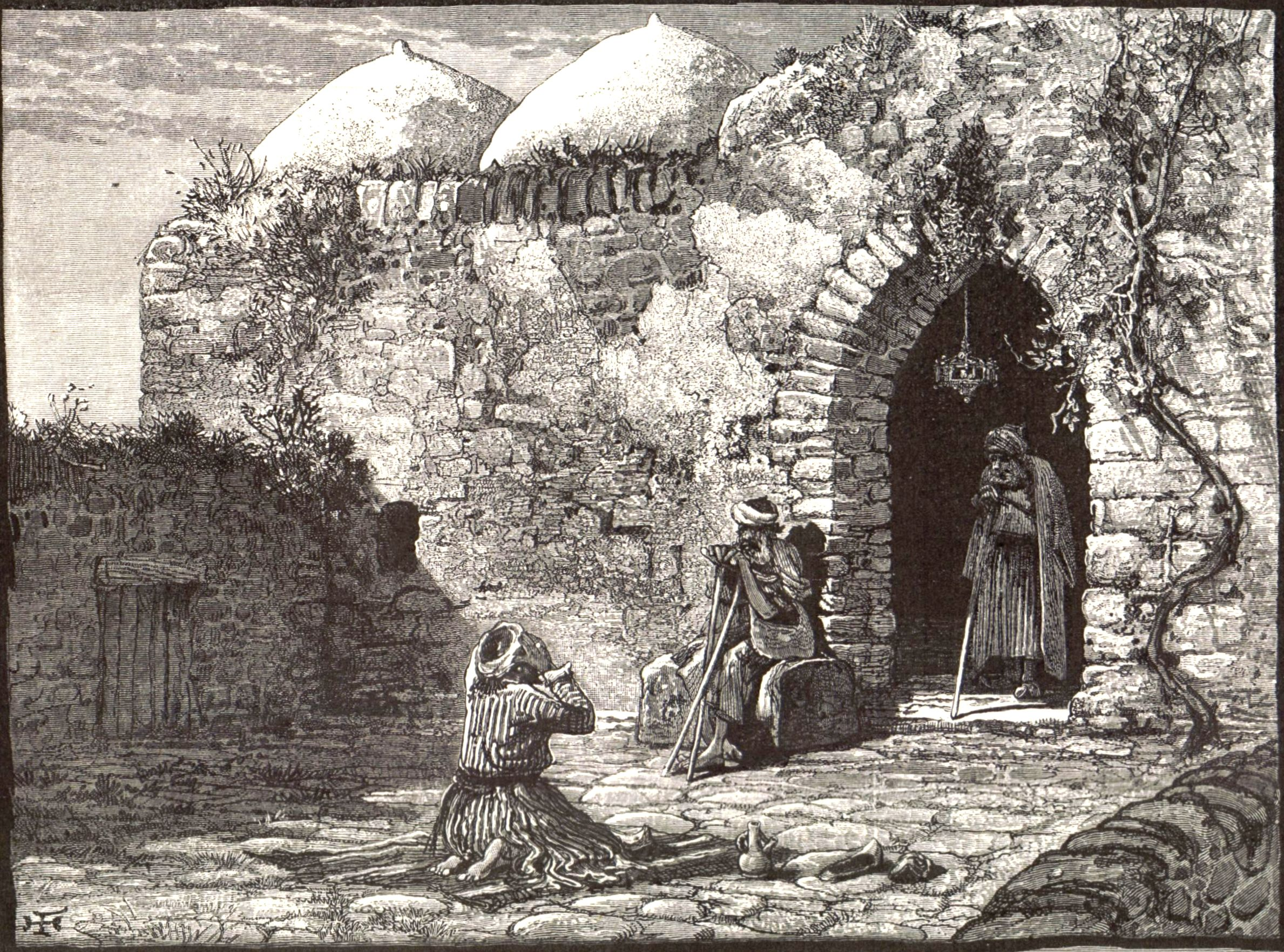
The Tomb of Jonah in Mashhad, reprinted in La Terre Sainte from Picturesque Palestine

Guérin visited the Holy Land eight times in 1852, 1854, 1863, 1870, 1875, 1882, 1884, and 1888. He won a French Academy of Sciences prize for his 7-volume Geographical, Historical, and Archaeological Description of Palestine. Much of Guérin's work describes ruins (khirbas) in places he visited.

== Published works ==
Guérin's Map of Palestine, with the places he visited (1881).

In his books Guerin writes about the identification and history of archaeological sites, often referring to passages from the Hebrew Bible, Greek mythology, and contemporary explorers and scholars such as Robinson and Titus Tobler. He also quotes from other Jewish sources such as the Mishna and Talmud, as well as Jewish travelers such as Benjamin of Tudela and Isaac Chelo. Guérin designed large scale maps to accompany the books, printed separately.

- Description de l'île de Patmos et de l'île de Samos. (1856)
- Voyage dans l’Île de Rhodes et description de cette Île. Paris (1856)
- Voyage archéologique dans la régence de Tunis. 2 Bde. Paris (1862)
- Guérin, Victor (1868). Description Géographique Historique et Archéologique de la Palestine (in French). Vol. 1: Judée, pt. 1. Paris: L'Imprimerie impériale.
- Guérin, Victor (1869). Description Géographique Historique et Archéologique de la Palestine (in French). Vol. 1: Judée, pt. 2. Paris: L'Imprimerie impériale.
- Guérin, Victor (1869). Description Géographique Historique et Archéologique de la Palestine (in French). Vol. 1: Judée, pt. 3. Paris: L'Imprimerie impériale.
- Guérin, Victor (1874). Description Géographique Historique et Archéologique de la Palestine (in French). Vol. 2: Samarie, pt. 1. Paris: L'Imprimerie nationale.
- Guérin, Victor (1875). Description Géographique Historique et Archéologique de la Palestine (in French). Vol. 2: Samarie, pt. 2. Paris: L'Imprimerie nationale.
- Guérin, Victor (1880). Description Géographique Historique et Archéologique de la Palestine (in French). Vol. 3: Galilée, pt. 1. Paris: L'Imprimerie nationale.
- Guérin, Victor (1880). Description Géographique Historique et Archéologique de la Palestine (in French). Vol. 3: Galilée, pt. 2. Paris: L'Imprimerie nationale.
- La Terre Sainte, Vol. I: Son Histoire, Ses Souvenirs, Ses Sites, Ses Monuments [The Holy Land: Its History, Its Records, Its Sites, Its Monuments], Paris: E. Plon & Co., 1882. (in French)
- La Terre Sainte, Vol. II: Liban, Phénicie, Palestine Occidentale et Méridionale, Pétra, Sinaï, Égypte [The Holy Land: Lebanon, Phoenicia, Western and Southern Palestine, Petra, Sinai, Egypt], Paris: E. Plon, Nourrit, & Co., 1884. (in French)
- Guérin, Victor (1889). Jérusalem : son histoire, sa description, ses établissements religieux (in French). Paris: E. Plon, Nourrit et Cie.
- La France catholique en Égypte. Tours (Neuausgabe, 1892)
- La France catholique en Tunisie. Paris (Neuausgabe, 1893)
