= Picturesque America =

1872 book series

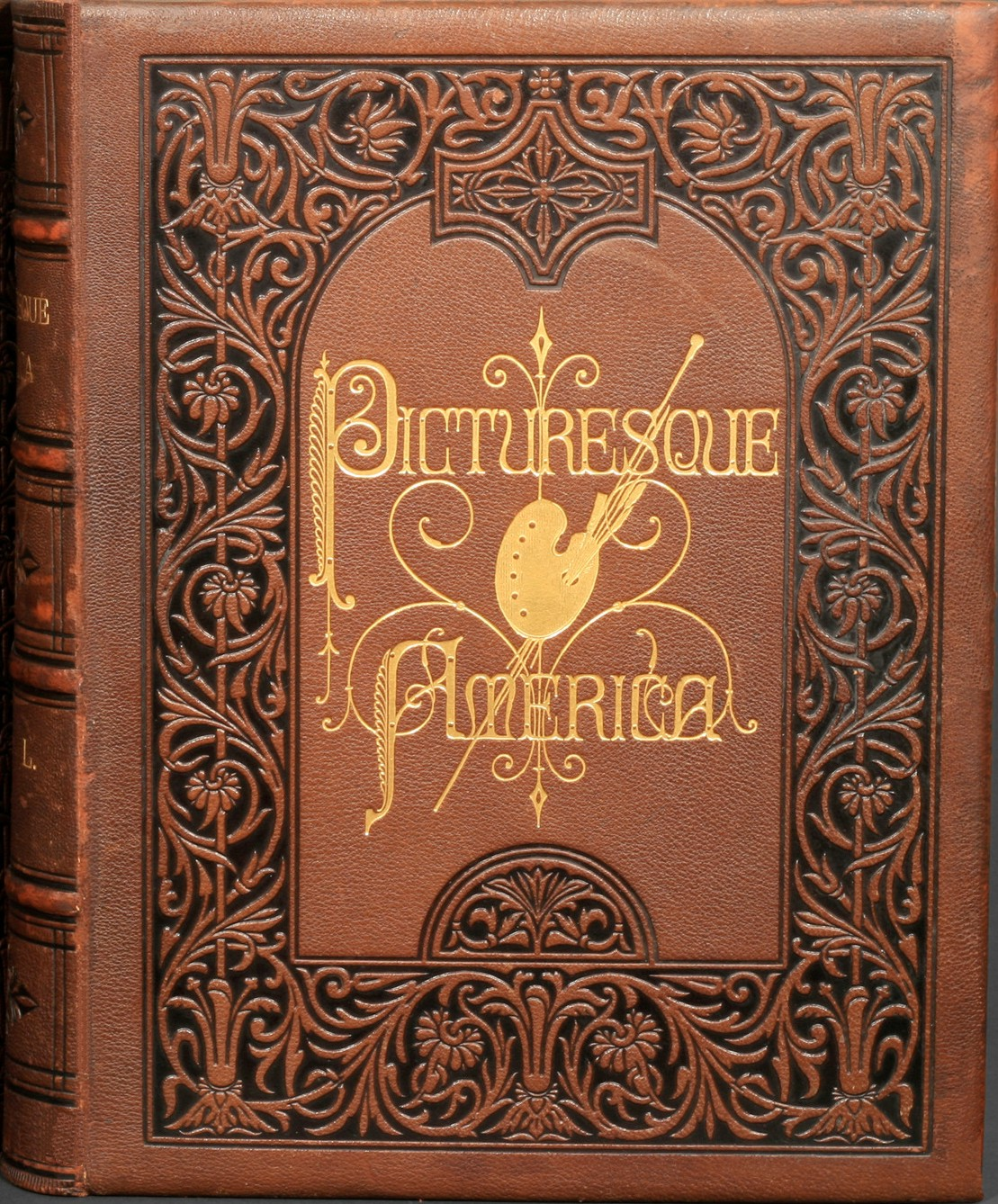
Cover of Volume I of Picturesque America

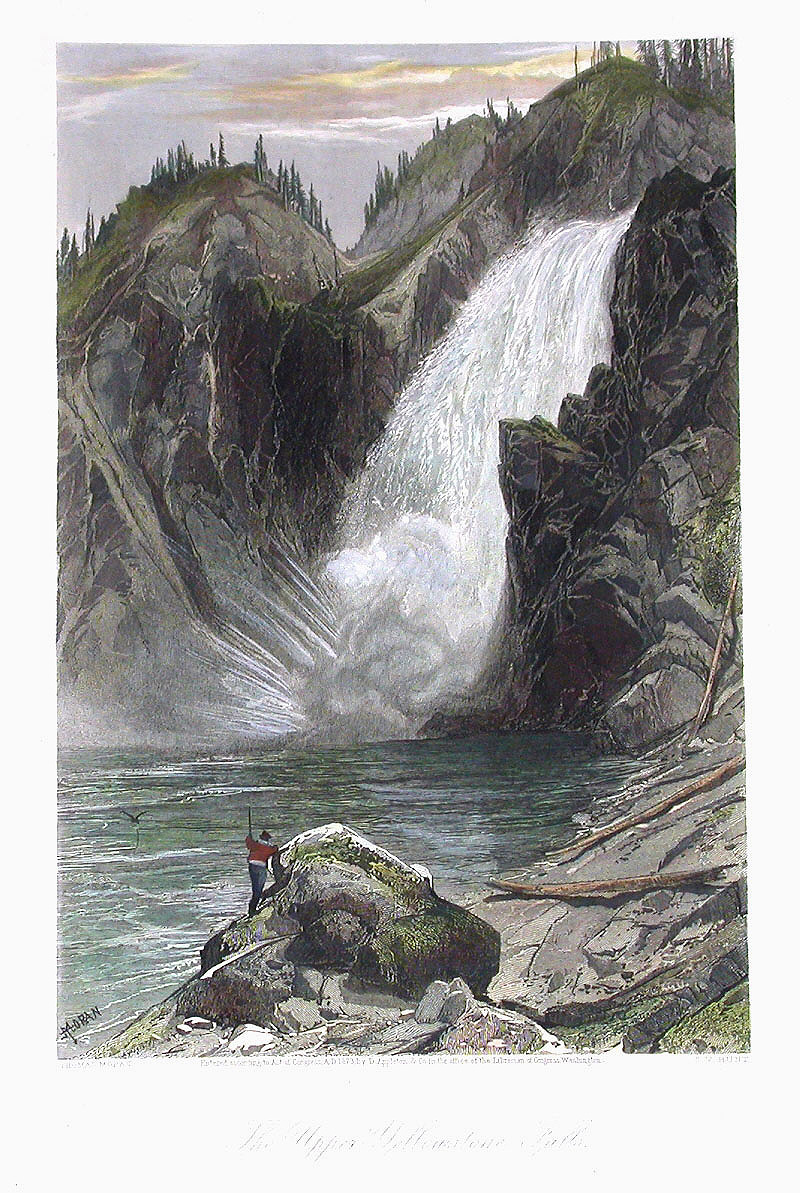
Upper Yellowstone Falls by Thomas Moran

Picturesque America was a two-volume set of books describing and illustrating the scenery of America, which grew out of an earlier series in Appleton's Journal. It was published by D. Appleton and Company of New York in 1872 and 1874 and edited by the romantic poet and journalist William Cullen Bryant (1794–1878), who also edited the New York Evening Post. The layout and concept was similar to that of Picturesque Europe. The work's essays, together with its nine hundred wood engravings and fifty steel engravings, are considered to have had a profound influence on the growth of tourism and the historic preservation movement in the United States.

The preface described "the design of this publication to present full descriptions and elaborate pictorial delineations of the scenery characteristic of all the different parts of our country. The wealth of material for this purpose is almost boundless."

This two-volume set and others of the same genre, achieved great popularity in the nineteenth century. Their illustrations provided a tour of nineteenth century America, unspoilt and pastoral, its centres of commerce, ports, architecture and natural treasures. In a modern (2001) treatment of the work, Sue Rainey, who is a historian of American graphic arts and has a particular interest in the artists who drew landscapes and cityscapes for periodical and book illustrations, wrote "As the first publication to celebrate the entire continental nation, it enabled Americans, after the trauma of the Civil War, to construct a national self-image based on reconciliation between North and South and incorporation of the West." (p. xiii) The volumes display both steel and wood engravings based on the paintings of some of the best American landscape painters of the nineteenth century, primarily Harry Fenn and his friend Douglas Woodward, but also including John Frederick Kensett, William Stanley Haseltine, James David Smillie, John William Casilear, Thomas Moran, A. C. Warren, David Johnson, Granville Perkins, Felix Octavius Carr Darley, Albert Fitch Bellows, James McDougal Hart, Casimir Clayton Griswold (1834–1918), Worthington Whittredge, Charles G. Rosenberg (1818–1879), William Ludwell Sheppard (1833–1912), Homer Dodge Martin, Alfred Rudolph Waud, William Hart, Robert Swain Gifford, Jules Tavernier, William Hamilton Gibson, and Thomas Cole.

Engravers included Robert Hinshelwood (1812–1885), Edward Paxman Brandard (1819–1898), Samuel Valentine Hunt (1803–1893), William Wellstood (1819–1900), William Chapin (1802–1888), Henry Bryan Hall (1808–1884). Robert Hinshelwood was born in Edinburgh in 1812 and emigrated to America in 1835 where he became renowned for his landscapes, etchings and engravings. His meticulous attention to detail was appreciated by publishing houses such as Appleton's and Harper's, and also by the Continental Bank Note Company who employed him to produce plates for the printing of currency. He died in New York.

Volume I engravings

- On the Coast of Maine
- St. John's and Ocklawaha Rivers
- Up and Down the Columbia
- Lookout Mountain and the Tennessee
- Richmond, Scenic and Historic
- Natural Bridge, Virginia
- Delaware Water-Gap
- Mauch Chunk
- On the Savannah
- The French Broad
- The White Mountains
- Neversink Highlands
- St. Augustine, Florida
- Charleston and its Suburbs
- Weyer's Cave, Virginia
- Scenes on the Brandywine
- Cumberland Gap
- Watkins Glen
- Scenes on Eastern Long Island
- The Lower Mississippi
- Mackinac
- Our Great National Park
- Harper's Ferry
- Scenes in Virginia
- Newport
- West Virginia
- Lake Superior
- Northern California
- Niagara
- Trenton Falls
- The Yosemite Falls
- Providence and Vicinity
- South Shore of Lake Erie
- On the Coast of California.

Volume II engravings

- Highlands and Palisades of the Hudson
- Philadelphia and its Suburbs
- Northern New Jersey
- Valley of the Connecticut
- Baltimore and Environs
- The Catskills
- The Juniata
- On the Ohio
- The Plains and the Sierras
- The Susquehanna
- Boston
- Lake George and Lake Champlain
- Mount Mansfield
- Valley of the Housatonic
- The Upper Mississippi
- Valley of the Genesee
- St. Lawrence and the Saguenay
- Eastern Shore
- The Adirondack Region
- The Connecticut Shore of the Sound
- Lake Memphremagog
- The Mohawk, Albany and Troy
- The Upper Delaware
- Water-Falls at Cayuga Lake
- The Rocky Mountains
- The Canons of the Colorado
- Chicago and Milwaukee
- A Glance at the Northwest
- The Mammoth Cave
- New York and Brooklyn
- Washington

This ambitious work was published and delivered as a subscription; semi-monthly parts were sent out to subscribers. Once complete, the subscription would be bound into volumes. A variety of bindings were available, from cloth-bound with leather corners at the low end to full Morocco leather bindings with elaborate tooling. The stately, bound two volume set was proudly displayed in parlors of subscriber homes as a show of status.

Nowadays, the publication frequently appears in antiquarian book collections; sometimes in pristine collection, but more frequently in poor condition. Lower-quality examples are frequently disassembled, their engravings removed and sold separately.

== See also ==
- Appleton's Journal, a monthly journal including many of the same artists
- The Aldine, a monthly journal of the same period established as a rival to Appleton's and employing many of the same artists
- Picturesque Europe
- Picturesque Palestine, Sinai, and Egypt
