= The Aldine =

American monthly arts magazine

- Editor: Richard Henry Stoddard
- Former editors: James Sutton
- Categories: Pictorial, art, literature
- Frequency: Monthly
- Publisher: Aldine Company
- Founded: 1868
- Final issue: 1879
- Company: James Sutton & Company
- Country: United States of America
- Based in: New York City
- Language: English
- ISSN: 2151-4186

The Aldine was a monthly arts magazine published in New York in the 1800s.

== History ==
The Aldine was published by Sutton Browne & Company starting in 1868 as The Aldine Press, which was shortened in 1871. Subtitles included A typographic art journal from 1871 to 1873, and The art journal of America from 1874 to 1879. Richard Henry Stoddard was the editor-in-chief from 1871 to 1875. The magazine contained high quality engravings of works by Thomas Moran and other Hudson River School painters. It also featured many reproductions of works by popular European academic artists such as Gustave Dore and William-Adolphe Bouguereau.

According to art historian Janice Simon, the "extensive accounts of what the editors deemed the nation's most picturesque and sublime regions ... branded The Aldine as a formidable competitor to Appleton's Journal and its publication of 1872, Picturesque America." Harry Fenn, prominent contributor to the many Picturesque publications, also did some work for Aldine.

The word "aldine" is defined in the Oxford English Dictionary as, first, an adjective, "Designating editions of Greek and Latin classics (including many first printed editions, or principes) issued at Venice by Aldus Manutius (Teobaldo Manucci, 1450–1515), and his family (c. 1490–1597). Also: designating the press which produced them, and certain fonts of printing type based on designs used there."
