= St Piran's (school) =

Coordinates: 51.5280°N 0.7322°W

- Gringer Hill; Maidenhead, Berkshire, SL6 7LZ; England

Information
- Type: Private preparatory day school
- Religious affiliation: Church of England
- Established: 1805; 221 years ago
- Local authority: Windsor and Maidenhead
- Department for Education URN: 110126 Tables
- Headmaster: Seb Sales
- Gender: Coeducational
- Age: 3 to 11
- Enrolment: ~350
- Website: http://www.stpirans.co.uk/

St Piran's is a prep school located on Gringer Hill in Maidenhead, Berkshire, England. The school was known as Cordwalles School until 1919 and has been co-educational since the 1990s.

== History ==
The origin of St Piran's was in 1805 at a small school, the Revd John Potticary's school in Blackheath, at 2–3 Eliot Place. After moving to its present location in 1872, it operated as a boys' boarding school under the name of Cordwalles School until 1919. Up to this time, it was among a group of preparatory schools – which included Stubbington House School and Eastman's Royal Naval Academy – that maintained strong connections with the Royal Navy. In that year, 1919, the school was bought by Major Vernon Seymour Bryant who renamed it St Piran's. It reopened in 1920 with 23 boys, increasing to 65 the following year.

After becoming an educational trust in 1972, the school became co-educational in 1993, and boarding ended the same year. In 2005, St. Piran's celebrated its 200th anniversary with a bicentennial pageant. In 2008 a new geography room and lower school hall were completed.

== Headmasters ==
To date, the headmasters of the school have been:

- John Potticary 1805–1820
- George Brown Francis Potticary 1820–1850
- Richard Cowley Powles 1850–1865
- Thomas Jackson Nunns 1865–1890
- Charles William Hunt 1890–1902
- Cyril Robert Carter 1902–1910
- Theodore William Keeling 1910–1912
- Mervyn Frank Voules 1912–1919
- Vernon Seymour Bryant 1919–1926
- Arthur Grendon Tippet DSO 1926–1943
- Lowther Grendon Tippet 1943–1972
- Guy Gross and Andrew Perry 1972–1980
- Andrew Perry 1980–1982
- Andrew Blumer 1982–2001
- Jonathan Carroll 2001–2019
- Seb Sales 2019–present

== Former pupils ==
- Admiral Sir Claud Barry, KBE CB DSO
- Benjamin Disraeli
- Cecil Malone
- Victor Mollo
- Vice Admiral Sir Peveril William-Powlett, KCB KCMG CBE DSO
- Thomas Field Gibson and his cousin Charles Ronalds
- Anthony West
- Patrick Leigh Fermor (expelled)
