= Picturesque Palestine, Sinai, and Egypt =

1881 books series edited by Charles William Wilson

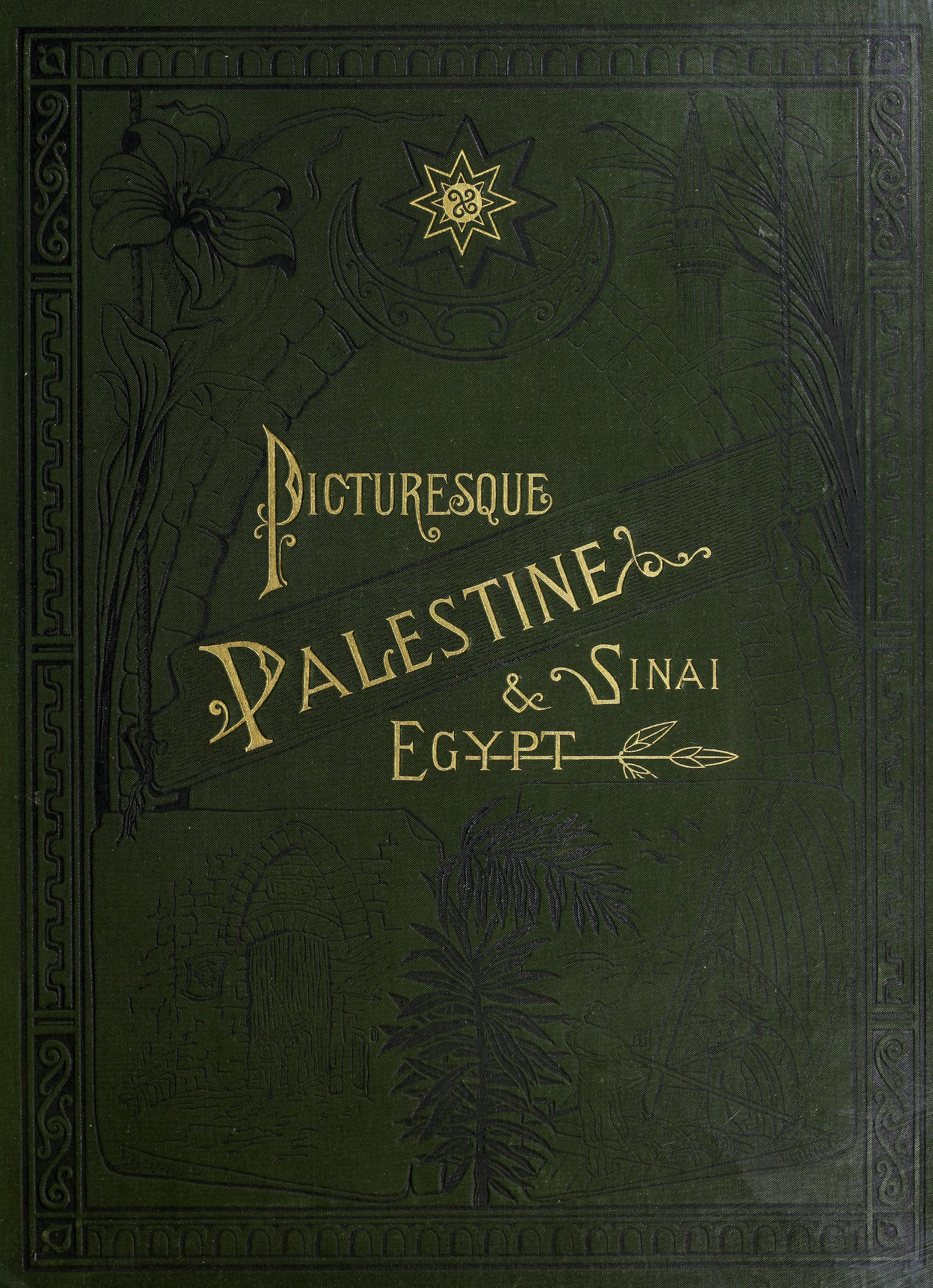
- The cover of the first edition's Division I
- Editor: Charles William Wilson
- Publisher: D. Appleton & Co.
- Publication date: 1880s

Picturesque Palestine, Sinai, and Egypt was a lavishly illustrated set of books published by D. Appleton & Co. in the early 1880s based on their phenomenally successful Picturesque America and Picturesque Europe series. It was edited by Charles William Wilson, following his leadership of the seminal Ordnance Survey of Palestine and PEF Survey of Palestine. The Appleton series was issued as "two volumes or four divisions"; it was reprinted in London by J.S. Virtue & Co., simply published as four volumes.

It was followed in 1884 by Stanley Lane-Poole's Social Life in Egypt, a kind of sequel that billed itself as "a supplement to Picturesque Palestine". It is sometimes treated as a "fifth volume" of the series, but did not use Fenn or Woodward for its art.

== Publication ==
Charles Wilson, a Royal Engineer, had attempted to improve British military intelligence in an age when spying was seen as "ungentlemanly" or "work of a low order", even successfully reducing his own role in order to get a general involved who would be able to defend the interests of the intelligence service. Never a spy as such, he simply "went in openly", scouting and studying areas of military interest. Throughout the 19th century, the Holy Land became increasingly important as a route between Europe and the Indian Ocean: important to Britain as a faster route to India and to other powers as way around the British-held choke point at Gibraltar. He had visited Jerusalem in 1864, spending ten months producing the Ordnance Survey of Palestine with the help of local workers and even the Prussian consul. He mixed research in Biblical archaeology with military and civilian intelligence about water courses and lines of defense. In addition to grants from the Treasury, the detailed maps and photographs produced sold very well, earning a profit on the endeavor in their own right. He then joined the Palestine Exploration Fund and directed the Survey of Western Palestine, which also acted as a "cover for military mapping".

Unlike the earlier Picturesque series, Picturesque Palestine did not employ numerous artists on the project but only used two of the more successful artists from the earlier books, Harry Fenn and J.D. Woodward. Their sketches were compiled on site during Woodward and Fenn's two joint tours of Egypt and the Levant in the winters of 1877–78 and 1878–79. The two trips are documented in his correspondence with Woodward's wife and his mother. The pair received special permission to sketch inside and under the Mosque of Omar (the Dome of the Rock), although Woodward compared the streets of Jerusalem with the "dirtiest alleys of Baltimore". Oppressed by the heat, glare, and barrenness, the best he could say about the shore of the Dead Sea was "I suppose it is not so bad it couldn't be worse". Nazareth was "the worst", while he was most impressed by the Syrio-Roman ruins at Baalbek.

The works were "enormously successful", with Woodward and Fenn each earning an estimated US$10 000 a year in royalties on the Holy Land volumes.

== Contents ==
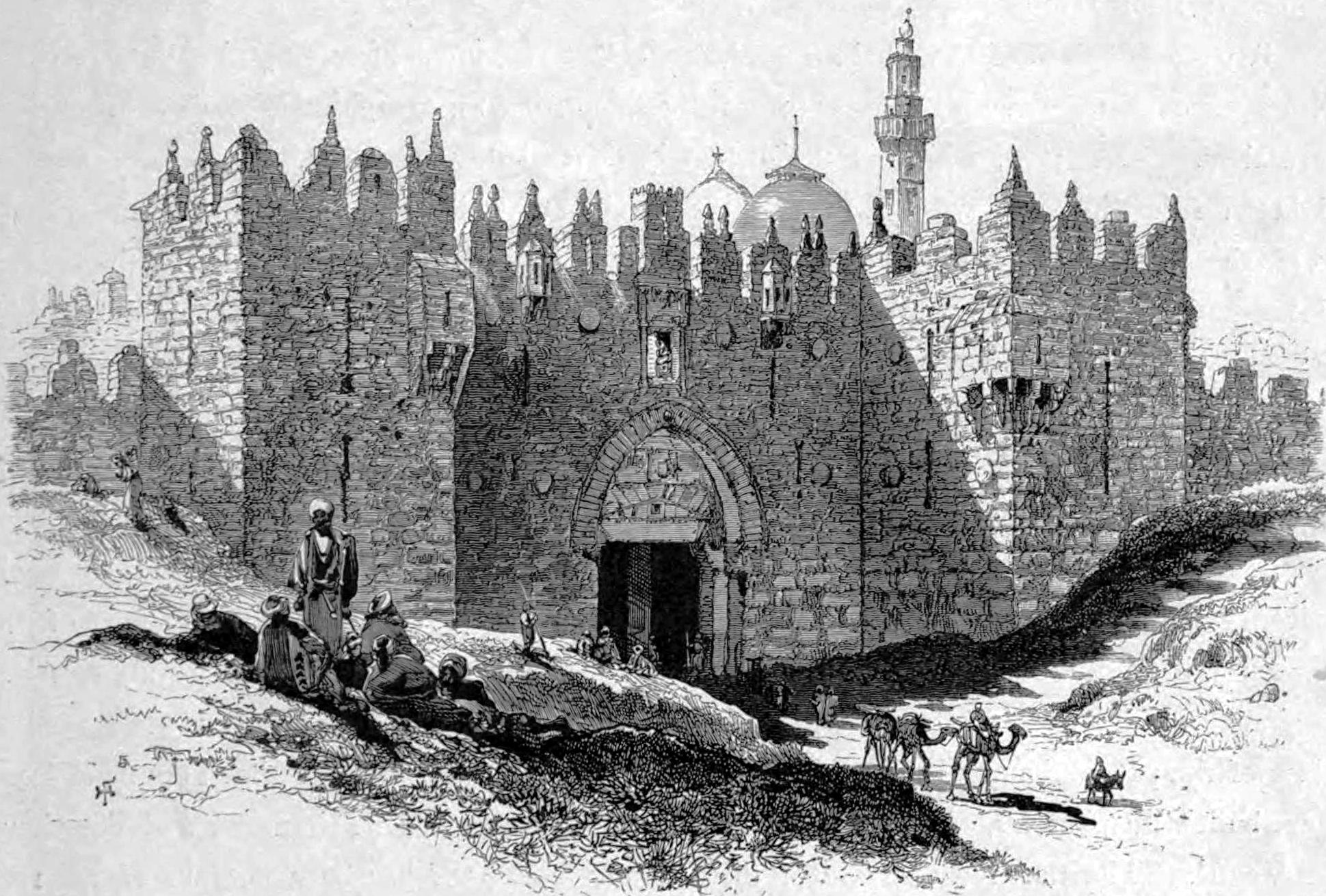
Damascus Gate, the northern entrance to Jerusalem

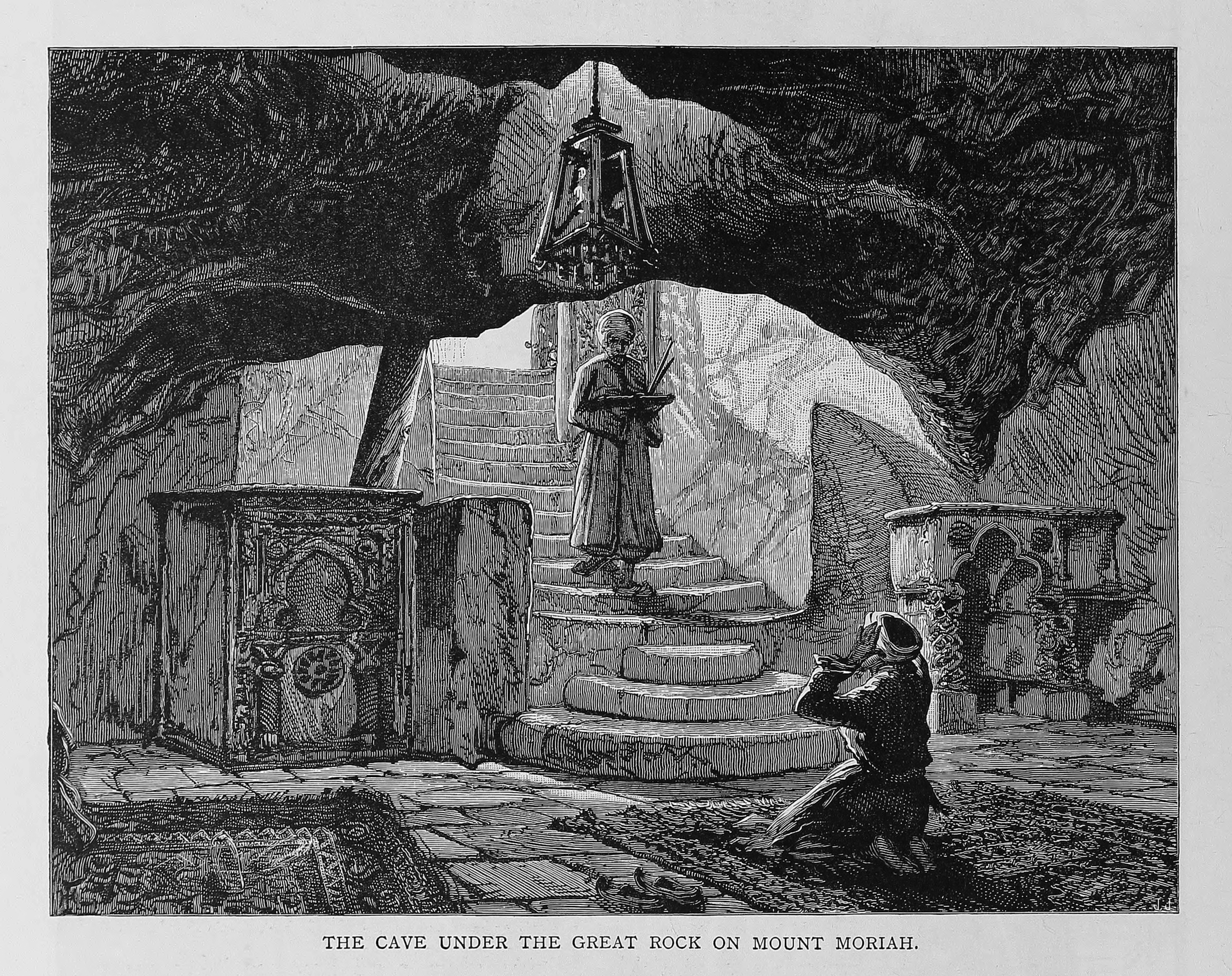
The Cave under the Great Rock on Mount Moriah, within the Dome of the Rock (then known as the "Mosque of Omar")

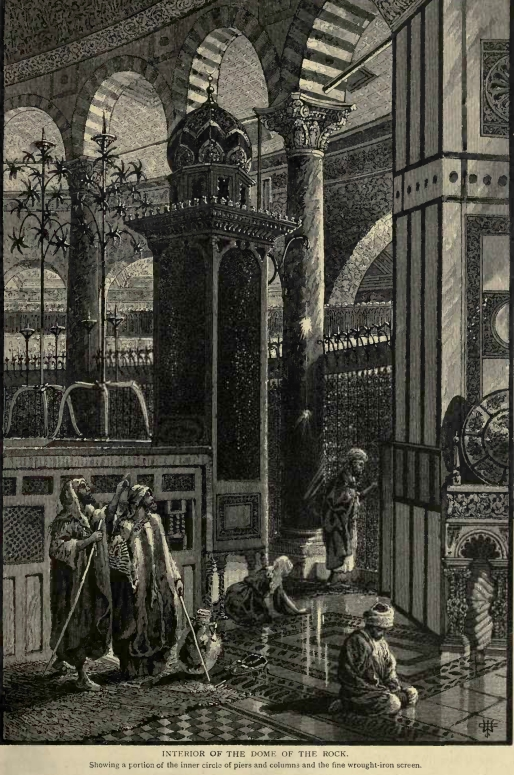
The Interior of the Dome of the Rock

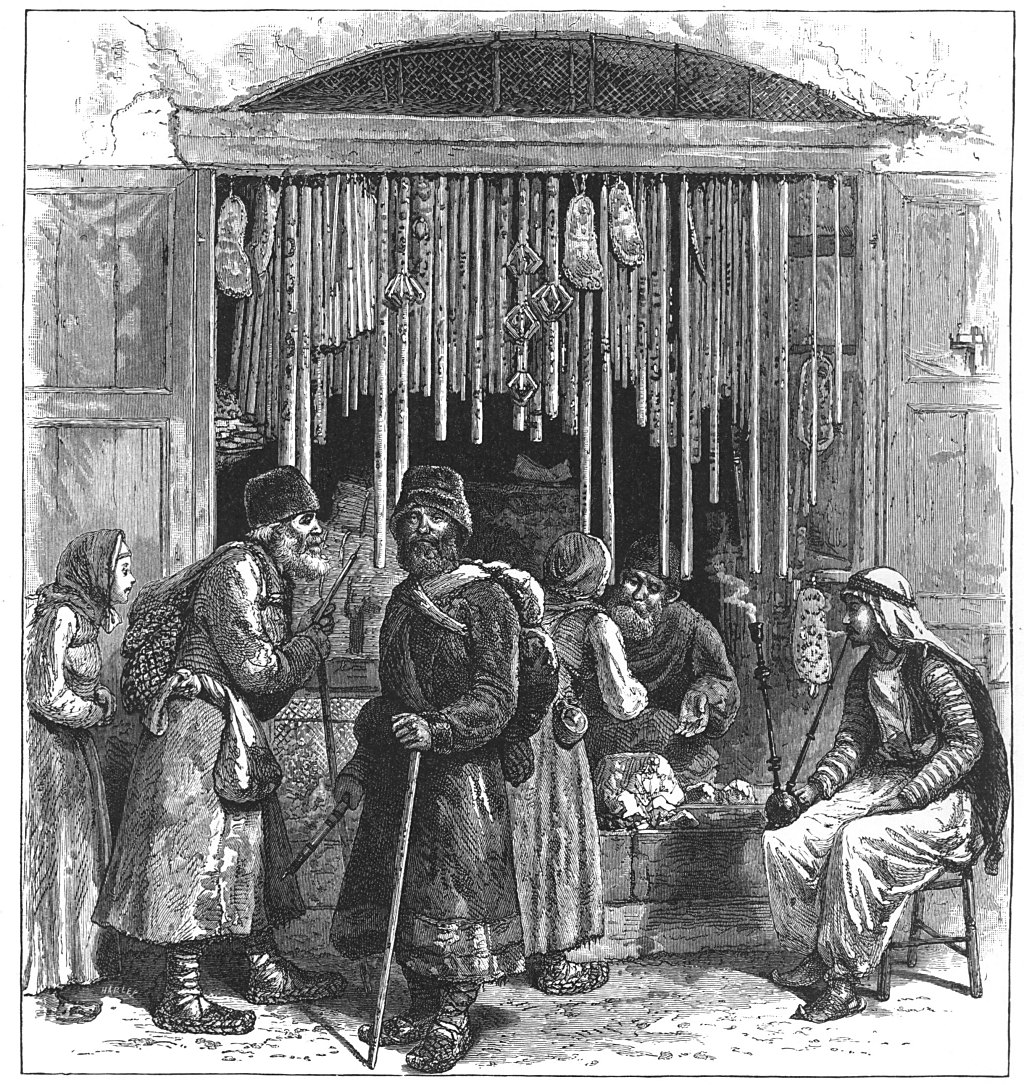
Russian pilgrims buying candles

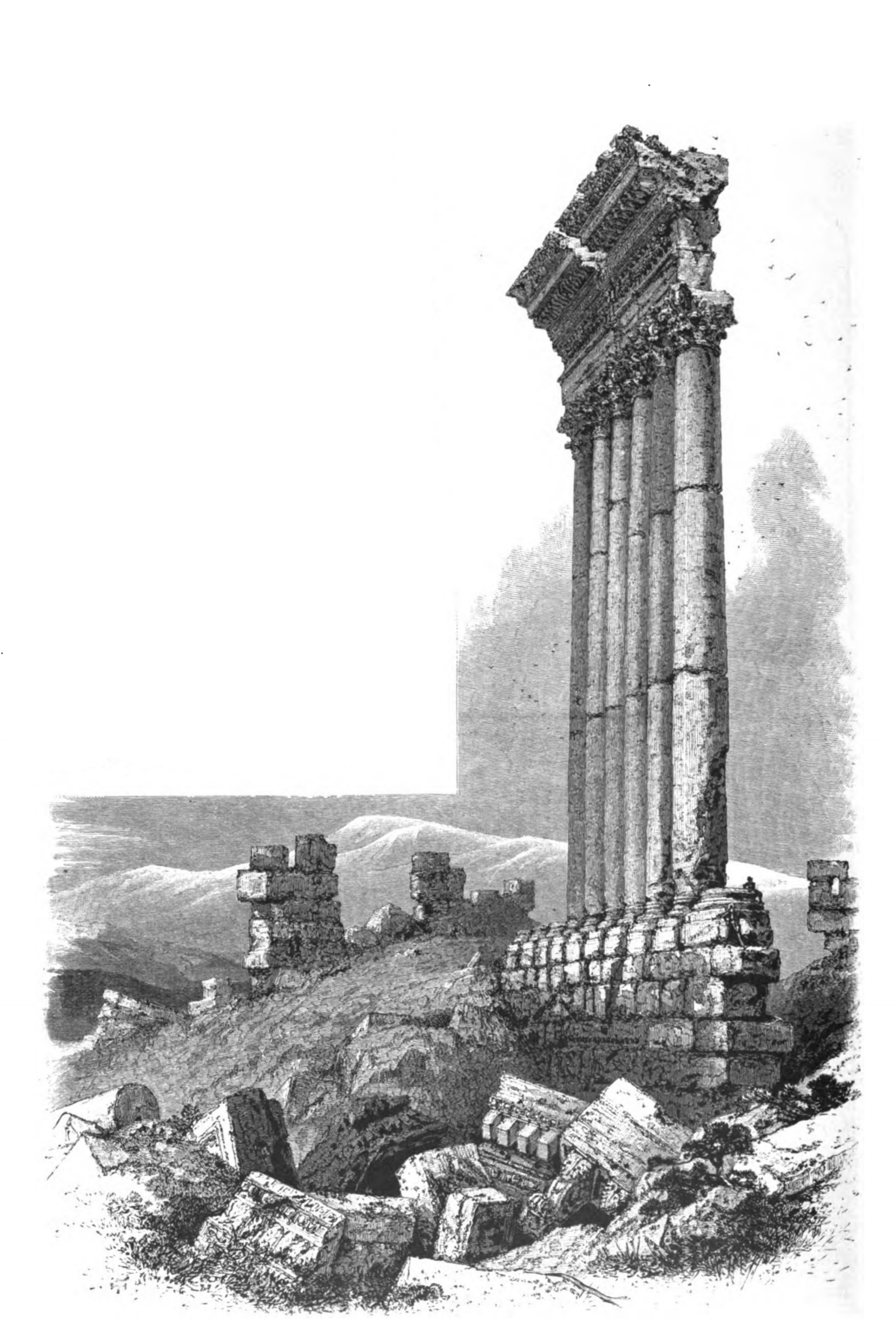
The Six Columns of the Great Temple, Ba'albek

=== Volume I ===
==== Division I ====
Division I was published separately and as part of Volume I in 1881. It included an introduction by Dean Stanley and sections on "Jerusalem" by Charles William Wilson; "Bethlehem and the North of Judaea" by Canon Henry Baker Tristram; and "The Mountains of Judah and Ephraim" by Lt. Claude Reignier Conder. It included steel engravings of Jerusalem from Scopus and from the Mount of Olives; the Dome of the Rock; Bethany; the Mount of Olives from Mount Zion; Bethlahem's Church of the Nativity; Mar Saba Monastery; the Plains of Jericho; the view from the Tomb of Samuel; and a threshing floor.

==== Division II ====
Division II was published separately and as part of Vol. I in 1881. It included sections on "Samaria and Plain of Esdraelon" by Mary Eliza Rogers; "Esdraelon and Nazareth" by Canon Tristram; "Galilee", "Northern Galilee", "Caesarea Philippi and the Highlands of Galilee", and "Mount Hermon and its Temples" by the American consul, Rev. Selah Merrill; "Damascus" by Philip Schaff; "Palmyra", "The Wady Barada", and "Ba'albek" by Samuel Jessup. It included steel engravings of Nablus; Mounts Tabor, Hermon, and Lebanon; the Valley of Nazareth; Tiberias; Caesarea Philippi; Damascus's rivers and streets; and Palmyra.

=== Volume II ===
==== Division III ====
Division III was published separately in 1881 and as part of Volume II in 1883. It included sections on "Phoenicia and Lebanon" by Henry W. Jessup; "The Phoenician Plain" by Canon Tristram; "Acre, the Key of Palestine", "Mount Carmel and the River Kishon", "Maritime Cities and the Plains of Palestine" by M.E. Rogers; "Lydda and Ramleh" and "Philistia" by Lt. Col. Warren; "The South Country of Judaea" by Canon Tristram; "The Southern Borderland and Dead Sea" by Prof. Palmer; and "Mount Hor and the Cliffs of Edom" and "The Covent of St. Catherine" by M.E. Rogers. It included steel engravings of the Kadisha Gorge; a well at Nazareth; a map of Palestine; Beirut's St George Bay; Sidon; Haifa and Mount Carmel; Caesarea; Jaffa; Hebron; and the entrance to the Valley of Petra.

==== Division IV ====
Division IV was published separately and as part of Vol. II in 1883. It included sections on "Sinai" by C. Pickering Clarke and on "The Land of Goshen", "Cairo", "Memphis", "Thebes", and "Edfû and Philae" by Stanley Lane-Poole. It included steel engravings of the Sea of Galilee; a map of Egypt and Sinai; Gaza; Tyre; El Hesweh; the Valley of Inscriptions; Mount Serbal; the Valley of Jethro; the Pyramids of Giza; Luxor; the Great Temple at Karnak; and Philae.

== Supplements & translations ==
Social Life in Egypt was published in 1884 as "a supplement to Picturesque Palestine". It included chapters on "The Townsfolk", "The Countryfolk", "School and Mosque", "The European Element", and an epilogue which focused largely on the "disastrous results" of Egypt's "vicious training of women" as the primary stumbling block in the way of Egyptian prosperity.

The series was translated into German as Palestine in Picture and Word (Palästina in Bild und Wort) with additional notes by the novelist and Egyptologist Georg Ebers in 1884. In 1882 and 1884, the artwork from Picturesque Palestine was also used for The Holy Land (French: La Terre Sainte), a popular 2-volume abridgment of Victor Guérin's scholarly 7-volume Geographical, Historical, and Archaeological Description of Palestine.

== See also ==
- Picturesque America
- Picturesque Europe
