= Harry Fenn =

English painter

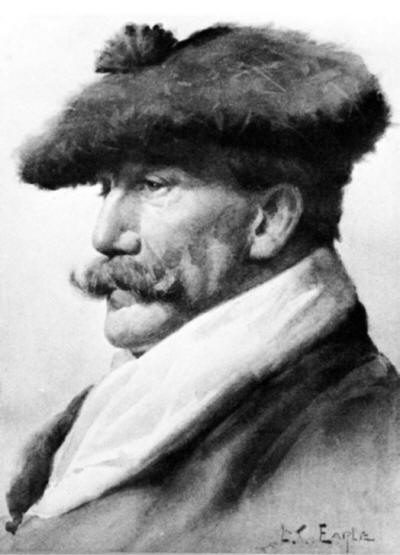
- Portrait of Harry Fenn, by L.C. Earle, date unknown
- Born: September 14, 1837; Richmond, near London
- Died: April 21, 1911 (aged 73)
- Education: Apprenticeship with Dalziel, London
- Known for: Engraver, etcher, painter, watercolourist and illustrator
- Movement: Orientalist

Harry Fenn (September 14, 1837 – April 22, 1911) was an English-born American illustrator, landscape painter, etcher, and wood engraver. From 1870 to around 1895 he was the most prominent landscape illustrator in the United States. He is also noted for his illustrations of Egypt, Palestine and the Sinai.

== Biography ==
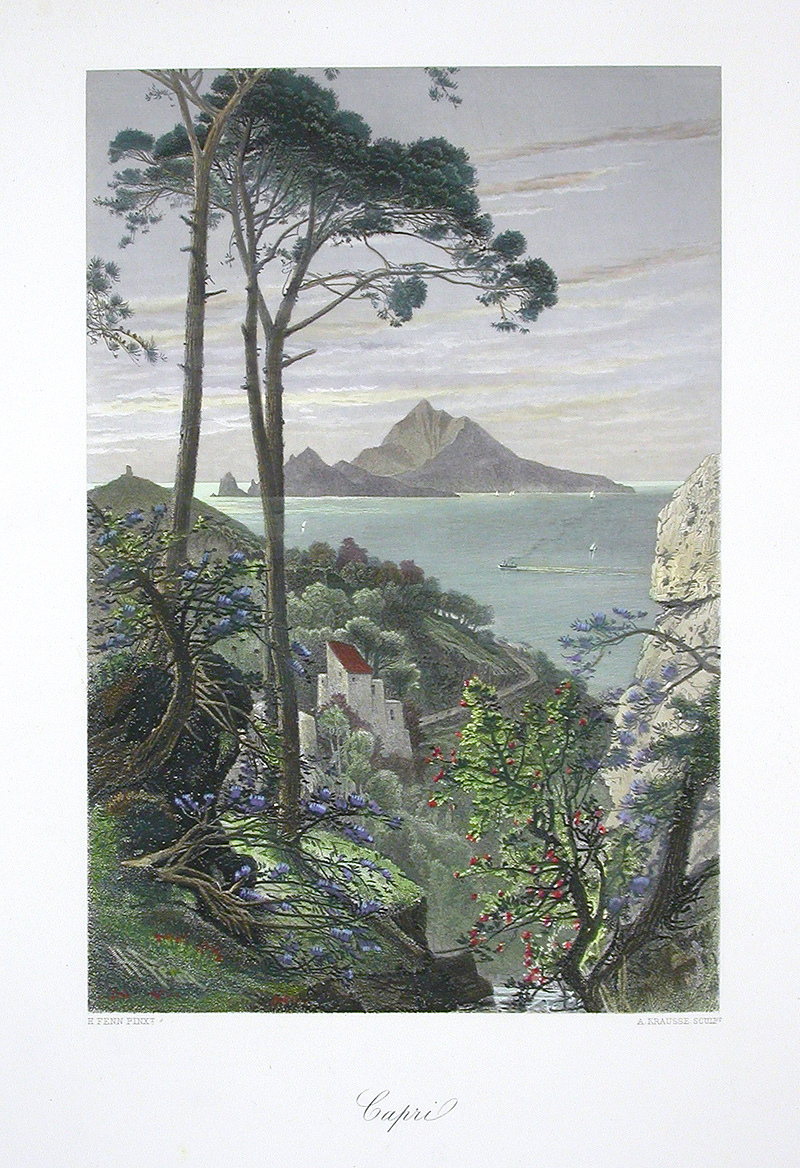
Capri

Fenn was born at Richmond, near London, England in 1837. He started as a wood engraver, serving and apprenticeship with the firm Dalziel of London, and soon turned to drawing for illustration and watercolor painting. In 1857, he made a trip to the U.S. to see the Niagara Falls and settled in New York where he worked first as a wood engraver. In 1862, he married Marian Thompson of Brooklyn. After an extended wedding trip to England and Italy, where Fenn studied painting, he focused on illustration in New York.

Fenn settled in Montclair, New Jersey, around 1865. His first highly successful commission was to illustrate John Greenleaf Whittier's Snow-Bound published by Boston's Ticknor and Fields in 1867 for the Christmas trade (dated 1868). Its tiny images apparently opened the eyes of many to the artistic possibilities of wood engravings, and it is often referred to as the "first gift book published in America," although it had predecessors. Fenn is best known for the engravings he contributed with his friend Douglas Woodward to three massive books filled with wood and steel engravings that were published by New York's D. Appleton and Co.: Picturesque America (1872–74), edited by William Cullen Bryant, which started as a serial in Appleton's Journal in 1870; Picturesque Europe (1875–79), and Picturesque Palestine, Sinai and Egypt (1881–84). Other artists contributed to each of these books, but Fenn was the most prolific contributor, and his innovative page designs combining image and text popularized this approach. Fenn and his family lived in England from 1873 to 1881 while Fenn worked on Picturesque Europe and Picturesque Palestine.

After returning to the U.S. in 1881, Fenn was a sought-after illustrator for the leading illustrator periodicals, Century Magazine, "Harper's Monthly," "Harper's Weekly," and Scribner's. He was commissioned to illustrate landscape throughout the world and the U.S. as well as to produce depictions of architecture and plant life. As the technologies for printing illustrations changed, Fenn adapted, producing ink drawings for reproduction as process line cuts and later watercolors for reproduction as halftones. He also contributed to numerous books of poetry. An edition of Gray's Elegy in a Country Churchyard published by Roberts Brothers in 1884 was stamped "Harry Fenn Edition" on the front cover. He was also the sole illustrator of an edition of Tennyson's "In Memoriam", published by Fords, Howard and Hulbert in 1897, in a very different style from his earlier designs for poetry.

Throughout his career Fenn prepared watercolors for exhibition and sale. He was among the founding members of the American Watercolor Society, attending the second meeting in 1867, and he regularly participated in their exhibitions. He was a member of the New York Watercolor Club, the Society of Illustrators, and the Salmagundi Club. He exhibited at the National Academy of Design in 1864 and at the Brooklyn Art Association between 1864 and 1885. He exhibited at the Centennial Exposition in Philadelphia in 1876 and at the Columbian Exposition in Chicago in 1893, where he was awarded a medal. Fenn died on April 22, 1911, at his home in Montclair, where he had lived since 1881.

=== Work ===
Fenn's works reached a wide audience and popularized publications with illustrations, expanding the field for other artists. As Sue Rainey wrote in her book Creating a World on Paper: Harry Fenn's Career in Art: "Fenn's dynamic and appealing compositions set a high standard. They built pride in America's scenic landscapes and urban centers, informed a curious, increasingly cosmopolitan public about foreign lands, and fostered an appreciation of printed pictures as artworks accessible to a growing middle class" (p. 1).

==== Illustrated works ====
- Picturesque America; or, The Land We Live In. A Delineation by Pen and Pencil of the Mountains, Rivers, Lakes, Forests, Water-falls, Shores, Cañons, Valleys, Cities, and Other Picturesque Features of Our Country. With Illustrations on Steel and Wood, by Eminent American Artists, Vol. I, New York: D. Appleton & Co., 1872.
- Picturesque America; or, The Land We Live In. A Delineation by Pen and Pencil of the Mountains, Rivers, Lakes, Forests, Water-falls, Shores, Cañons, Valleys, Cities, and Other Picturesque Features of Our Country. With Illustrations on Steel and Wood, by Eminent American Artists, Vol. II, New York: D. Appleton & Co., 1874.
- Picturesque Europe: A Delineation by Pen and Pencil of the Natural Features and the Picturesque and Historical Places of Great Britain and the Continent. Illustrated on Steel and Wood by European and American Artists, Vol. I, New York: D. Appleton & Co., 1875.
- Picturesque Europe: A Delineation by Pen and Pencil of the Natural Features and the Picturesque and Historical Places of Great Britain and the Continent. Illustrated on Steel and Wood by European and American Artists, Vol. II, New York: D. Appleton & Co., 1878.
- Picturesque Europe: A Delineation by Pen and Pencil of the Natural Features and the Picturesque and Historical Places of Great Britain and the Continent. Illustrated on Steel and Wood by European and American Artists, Vol. III, New York: D. Appleton & Co., 1879.
- Picturesque Palestine, Sinai, and Egypt, Div. I, New York: D. Appleton & Co., 1881.
- Picturesque Palestine, Sinai, and Egypt, Div. II, New York: D. Appleton & Co., 1881.
- Picturesque Palestine, Sinai, and Egypt, Div. III, New York: D. Appleton & Co., 1881.
- Picturesque Palestine, Sinai, and Egypt, Div. IV, New York: D. Appleton & Co., 1883.
- Basbanes, Nicholas A. (2002). Among the Gently Mad: Perspectives and Strategies for the Book Hunter in the Twenty-First Century. Henry Holt & Co. p. 125. ISBN 0-8050-5159-7.

==== Illustrations ====
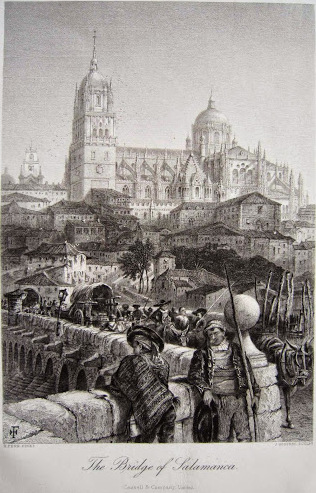
Roman Bridge of Salamanca, 1860

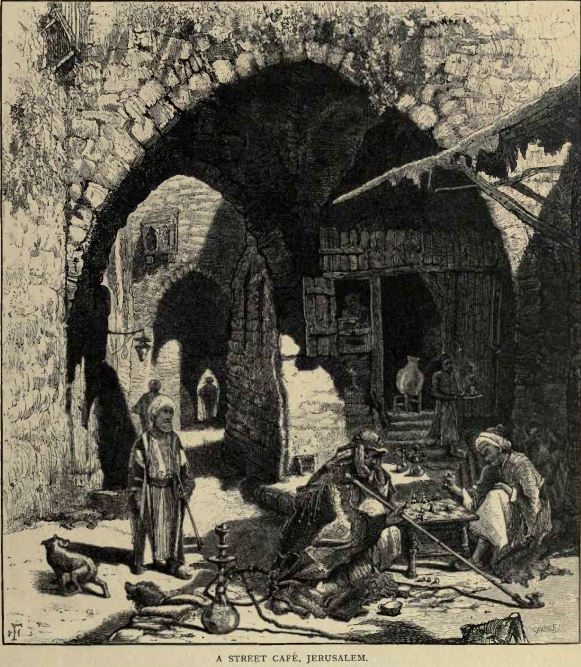
Jerusalem Cafe, 1880

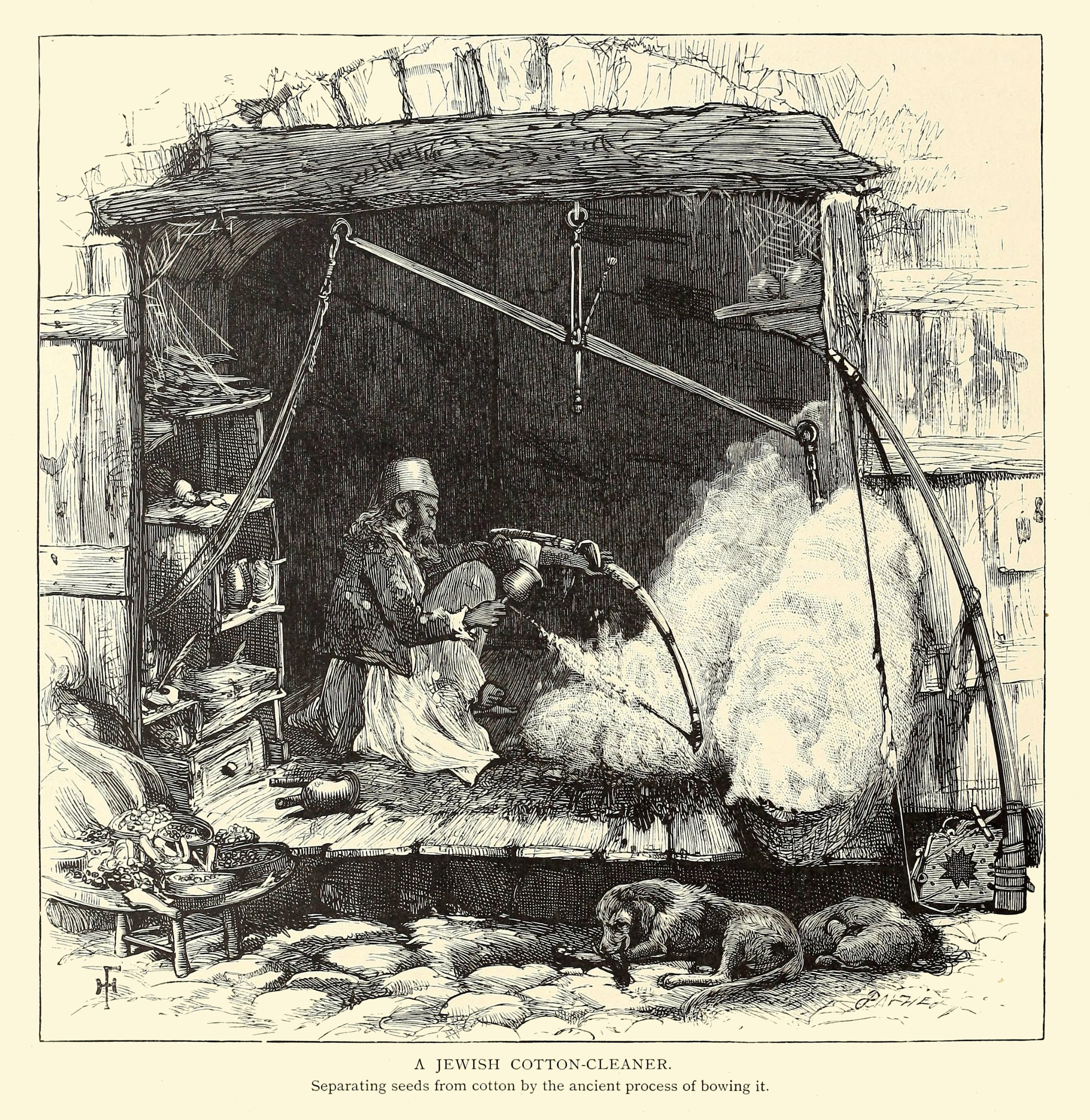
A Jerusalem Jewish Cotton Cleaner, 1880

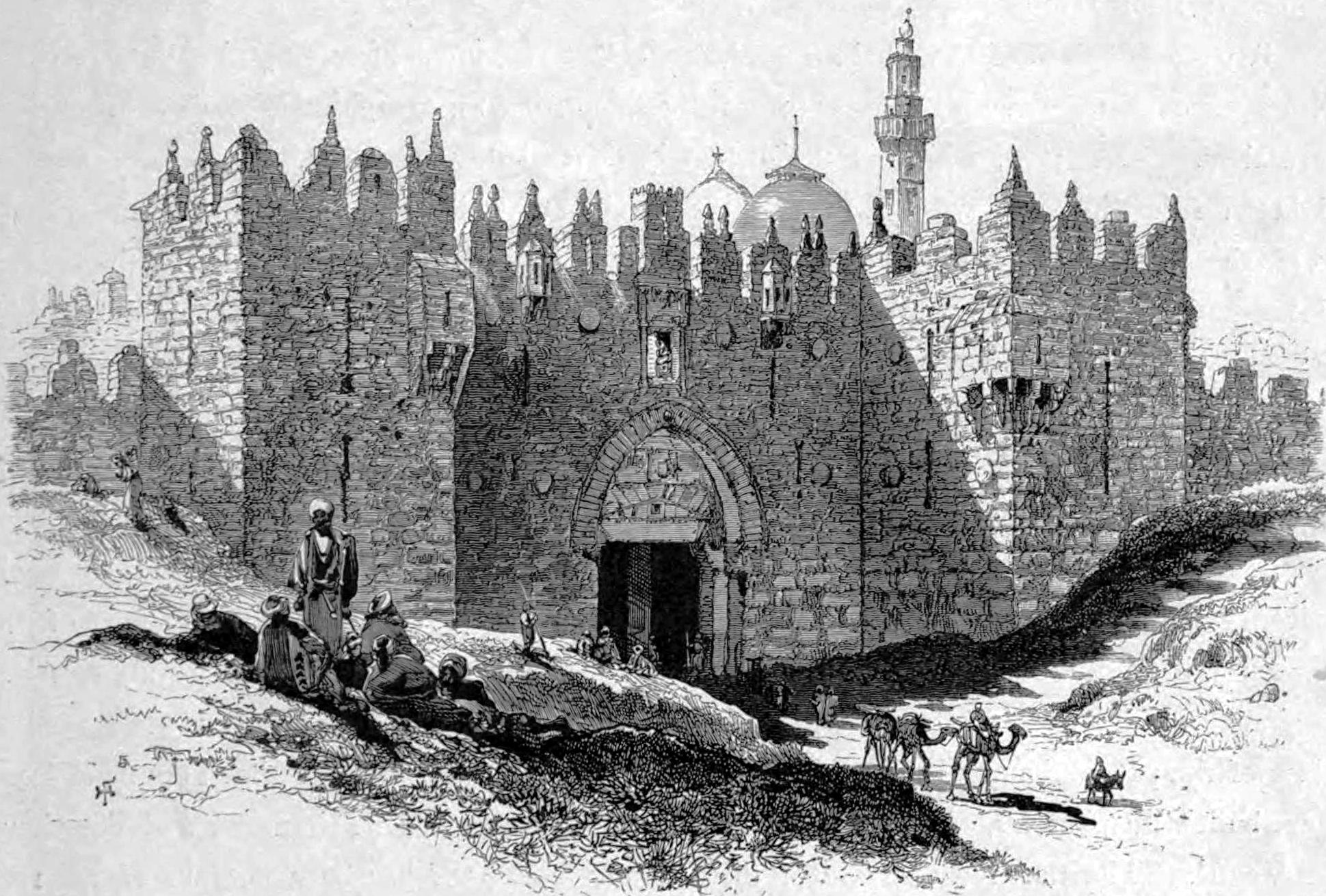
Damascus Gate, 1880

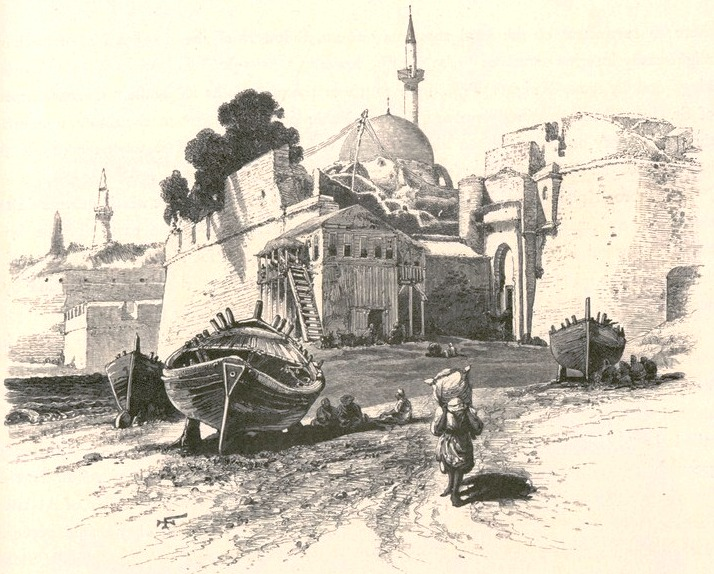
Gate of 'Akka, 1881-1884

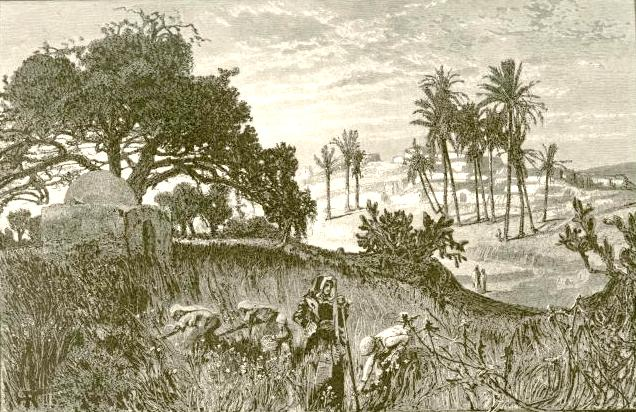
Eshdûd, the ancient Ashdod. Called by the Greeks Azotus, (1881-1884)

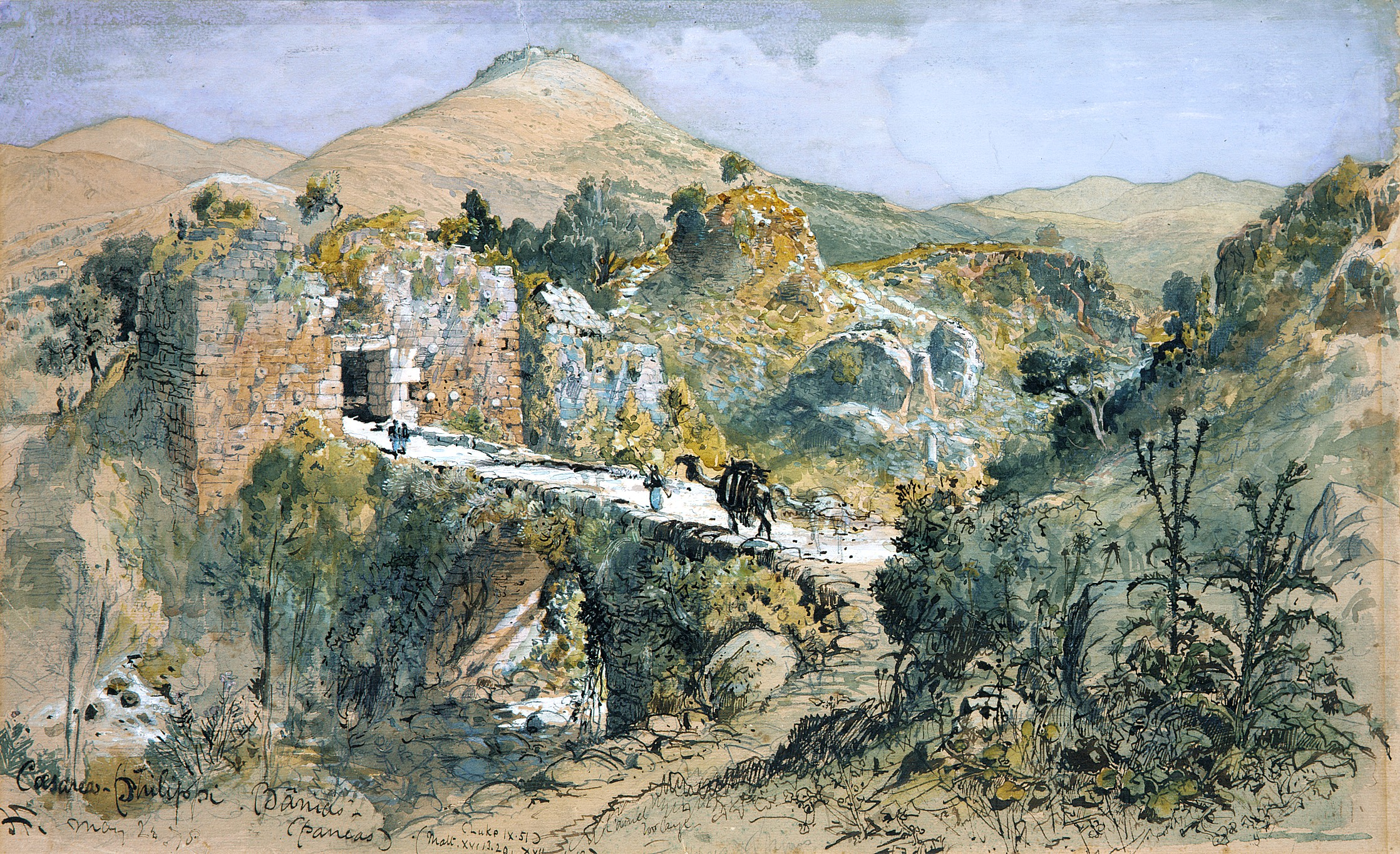
Caesarea Philippi (Banias), date unknown

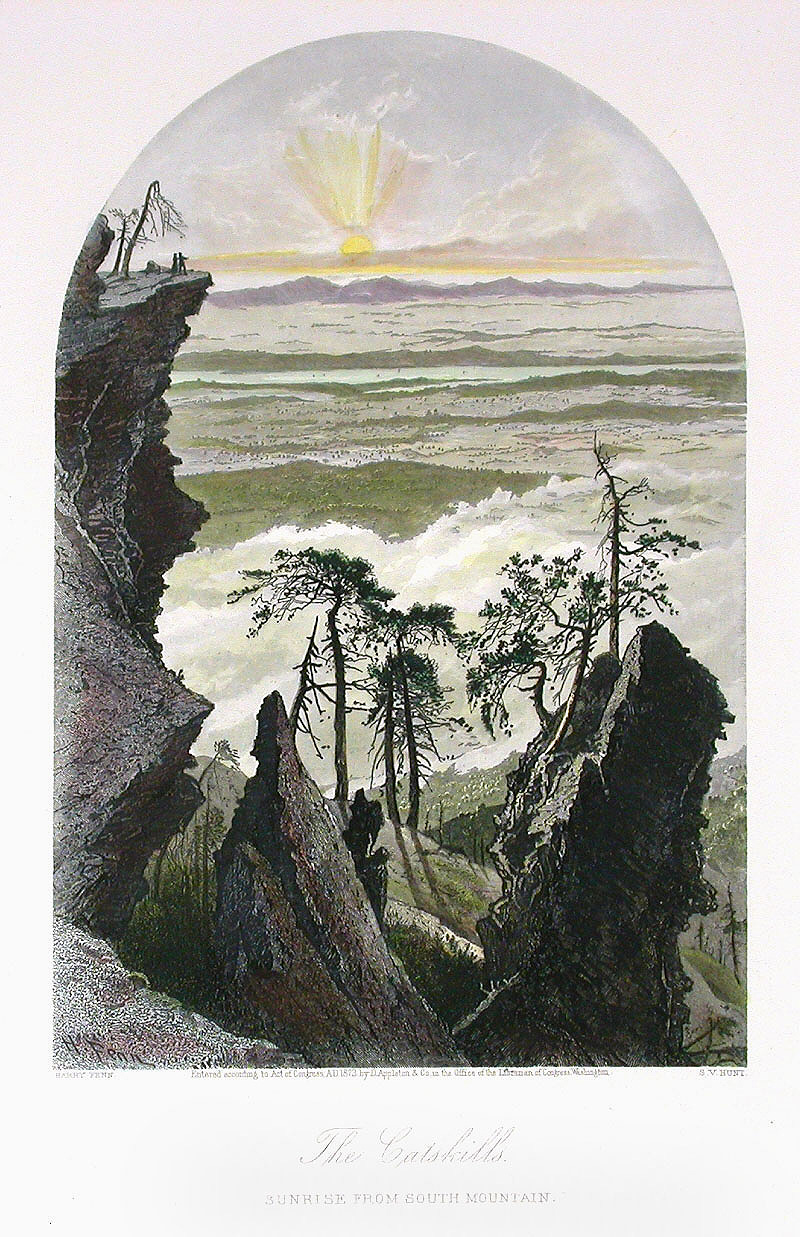
Catskills, illustration, date unknown

== See also ==
- List of Orientalist artists
- Orientalism

== Bibliography ==
- Rainey, Sue (2013). Creating a World on Paper: Harry Fenn's Career in Art. Amherst and Boston: University of Massachusetts Press. p. 392. ISBN 978-1-55849-979-9.
- Rainey, Sue (1994). Creating Picturesque America: Monument to the Natural and Cultural Landscape. Nashville: Vanderbilt University Press. p. 383. ISBN 1-55709-534-5.
- Rainey, Sue (1998). "Harry Fenn". Dictionary of Literary Biography. Vol. 188. Detroit, Washington, D.C., London: Gale Research. pp. 95–104.
- Rainey, Sue (2005). "Illustration "Urgently Required": The Picturesque Palestine Project, 1878–83". Prospects: An Annual of American Cultural Studies. 30: 181–260.
- Shepard, Elizabeth; Royal F. Shepard (2003). Montclair. Arcadia Publishing. p. 45. ISBN 0-7385-1349-0.
