= Richard John King =

English antiquarian and scholar of medieval poetry

Richard John King (18 January 1818–10 February 1879) was an English antiquarian and scholar of medieval poetry. He is best known as a writer of handbooks.

== Life ==
He was the eldest son of Richard King and his wife Mary Grace Windeatt, and was born on 18 Jan. 1818 at Montpelier, Pennycross, a chapelry attached to St Andrew, Plymouth. His father died in April 1829; his mother survived until 13 January 1884. He matriculated at Exeter College, Oxford, on 17 November 1836, and graduated B.A. in 1841.

On his father's death King inherited a substantial property, including the estate of Bigadon in Buckfastleigh, Devon, where he lived until 1854. The lands, however, were heavily mortgaged, and in that year they were sold under pecuniary pressure, when he was also forced to part with his father's collection of pictures and the magnificent library which he himself had amassed. King then withdrew to The Limes, Crediton, and supported himself by writing. He was elected a member of the Devonshire Association in 1874, and its president in 1875, when his address dealt with the early history of Devon.

King died at The Limes, Crediton on 10 February 1879, and was buried in its churchyard. The east window of the lady-chapel being filled with stained glass in his memory. The east window and four smaller windows in Buckfastleigh Church were given by him when he was residing at Bigadon.

== Works ==
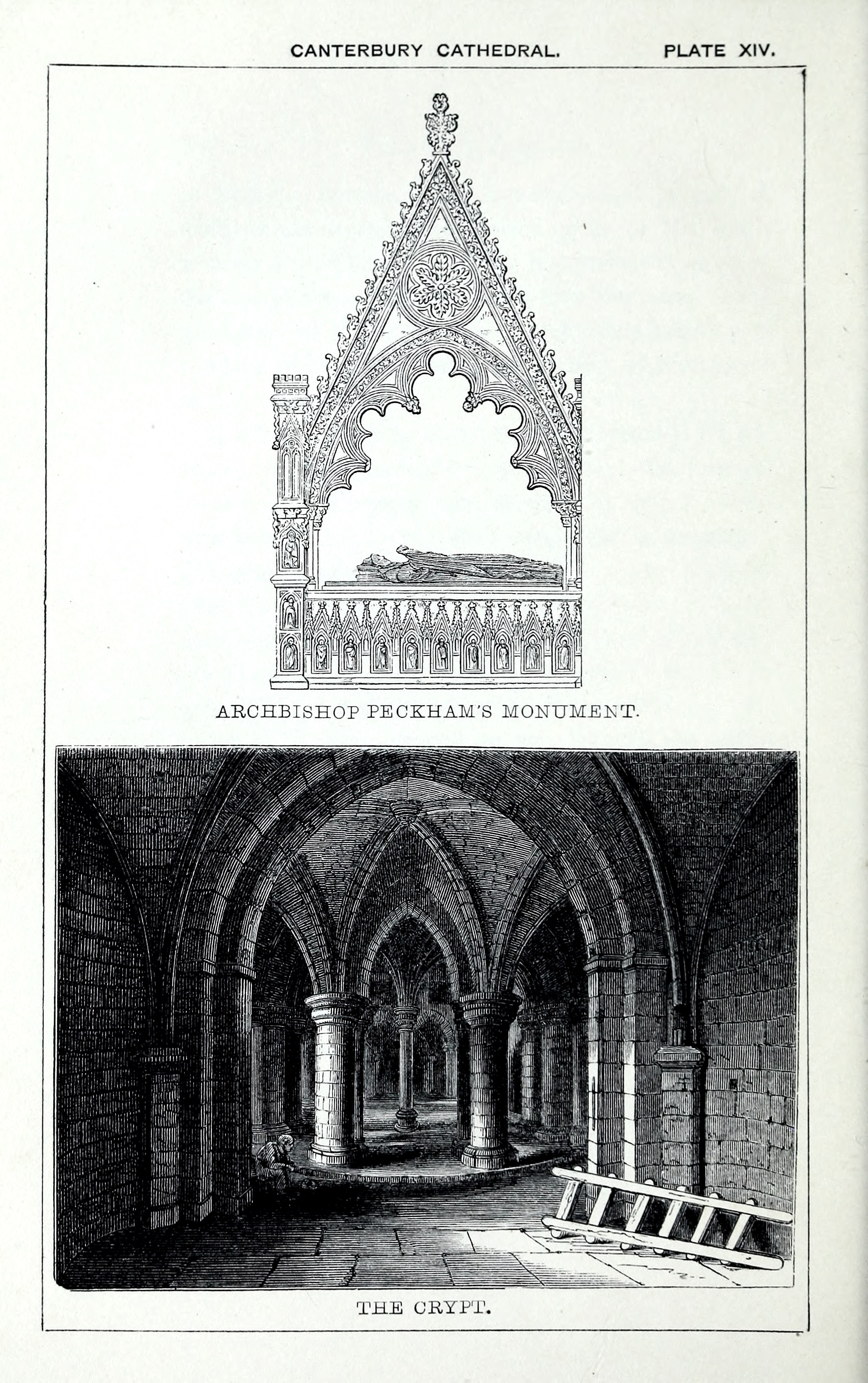
Canterbury Cathedral, Peckham Monument and crypt, illustration from Handbook to the cathedrals of England: Southern Division (1861)

King's first major work was Selections from Early Ballad Poetry, 1842, with notes. He contributed to Murray's Handbooks for Travellers with Kent and Sussex (1858), Surrey and Hampshire (1858), Eastern Counties (1861), and Yorkshire (1866–8). Those for Northamptonshire (1872–7) and Warwickshire with Hertfordshire (1872–5) were partly written by him. He was the main writer for Murray's Handbooks to the Cathedrals of England, which were issued during 1861–9, and in the subsequent volume on the Cathedrals of Wales (1873). The Handbook to Hereford Cathedral was printed off separately in 1864, and the account of the three choirs (Gloucester, Hereford, and Worcester) appeared in one volume in 1866.

A novel Anschar: a Story of the North (Plymouth 1850), was published anonymously in 1850, based on Ansgar's mission of converting the Norsemen to Christianity. A selection from King's articles was published in 1874 as Sketches and Studies.

=== Other writings ===
The Supernatural Beings of the Middle Ages and The Origin of the Romance Literature of the XII and XIII Centuries, dedicated to Richard Cowley Powles, were lectures read before the Essay Society of Exeter College, printed by King in 1840, for private distribution. To the Oxford Essays for 1856) he contributed a paper on Carlovingian Romance, later included in his Sketches and Studies. The Forest of Dartmoor and its Borders: an Historical Sketch was a fragment from a planned history of Devon. He contributed papers to the Transactions of the Devonshire Association. With several of its members he was engaged in translating and editing the "Devonshire Domesday".

King frequently wrote in the Academy and in Notes and Queries. For the Encyclopædia Britannica ninth edition he supplied accounts of Cornwall and Devon. The first five parts of Our Own Country were written by him for Cassell & Co., and he assisted in the compilation of Picturesque Europe.
