= John Mogford =

English painter

John Mogford (1821– 2 November 1885) was an English landscape painter.

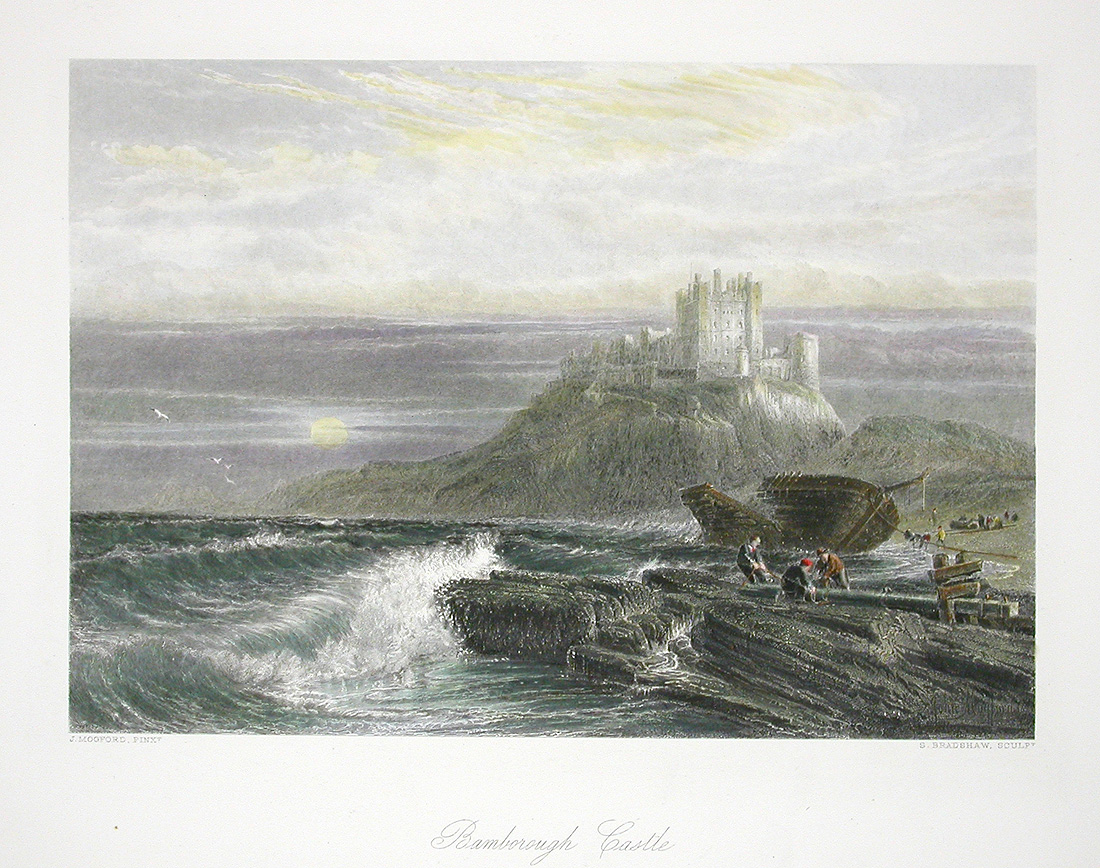
Bamborough Castle, 1875 plate from Picturesque Europe, after John Mogford

== Life ==
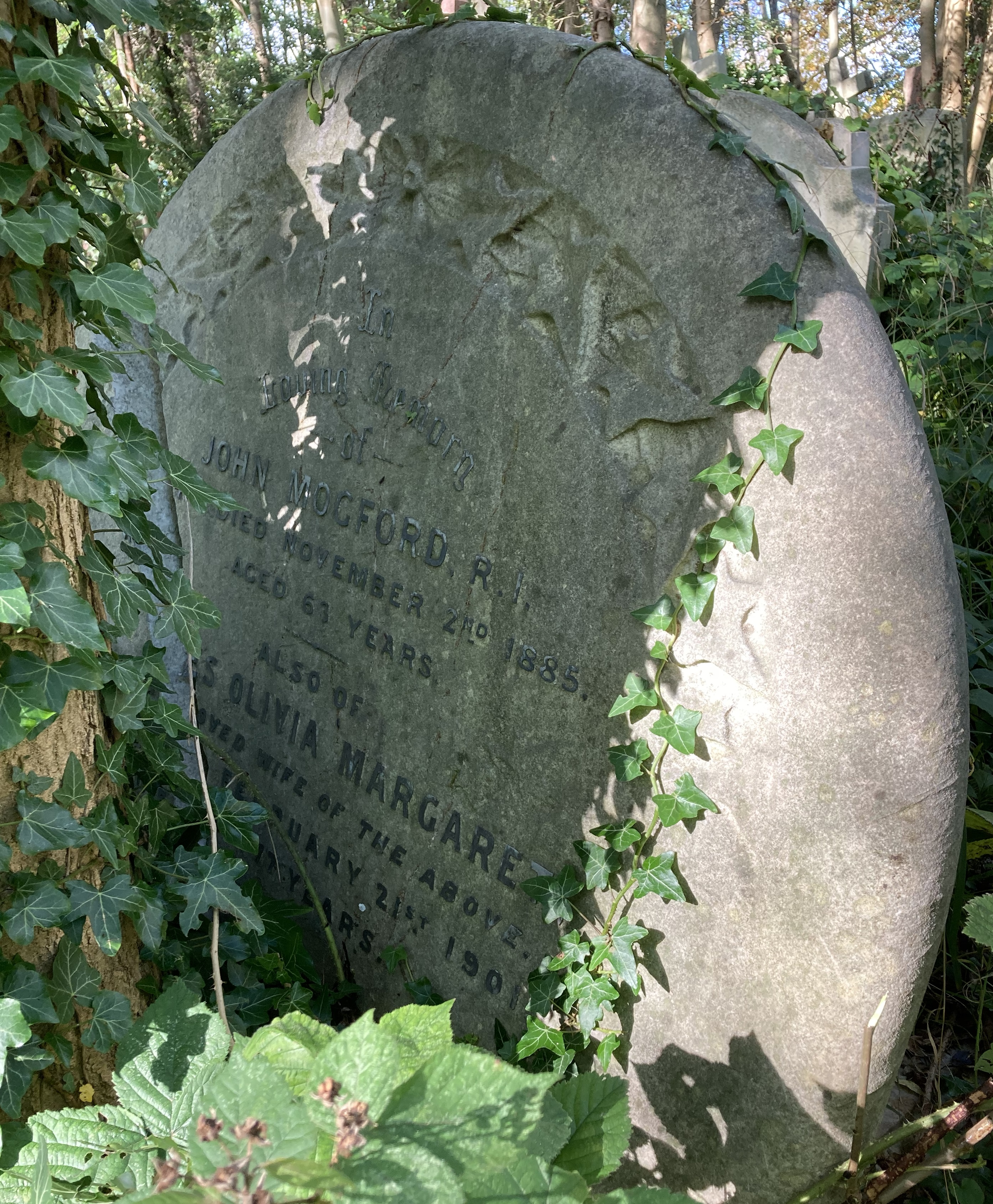
Grave of John Mogford in Highgate Cemetery

Mogford's background was in Devon. He studied at the Somerset House Government School of Design, and then exhibited at the Royal Academy, British Institution and Suffolk Street Gallery. He lived in Hampstead, and became a member of the Institute of Painters in Watercolours, where he was known for his Cornish landscapes.

Mogford taught at the Maddox Street art school, where his pupils included Emily Mary Osborn. He married a daughter of Francis Danby.

He died on 2 November 1885 and was buried on the eastern side of Highgate Cemetery.
