= Carl Werner =

German watercolour painter (1808–1894)

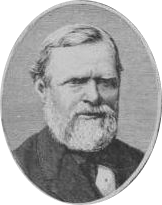
- Werner in 1888
- Born: 4 October 1808; Weimar
- Died: 10 January 1894 (aged 85); Leipzig
- Education: Julius Schnorr von Carolsfeld, Leipzig
- Known for: Painter and academic
- Movement: Orientalist

Carl Friedrich Heinrich Werner (4 October 1808 – 10 January 1894) was a German watercolor painter.

== Biography ==
Born in Weimar, Werner studied painting under Julius Schnorr von Carolsfeld in Leipzig. He switched to studying architecture in Munich from 1829 to 1831, but thereafter returned to painting. He won a scholarship to travel to Italy, where he ended up founding a studio in Venice and remaining until the 1850s, making a name for himself as a watercolor painter. He exhibited around Europe, in particular travelling often to England, where he exhibited at the New Watercolour Society.

He travelled through Spain in 1856-1857, in 1862 to Palestine and then to Egypt, and to the latter country he returned for a longer trip in 1864. Particularly notable were his watercolors in Jerusalem, where he was one of the few non-Muslims able to gain access to paint the interior of the Dome of the Rock. He published a large body of work in London as Jerusalem and the Holy Places, and some more watercolors from Egypt in 1875 as Carl Werner's Nile Sketches. He later travelled to Greece and Sicily, and became a professor at the Leipzig Academy. He died in Leipzig in 1894.

His works include:

- Venice in her Zenith and Decline
- The Ducal Palace, with a Scene from the Merchant of Venice
- The Triumphal Procession of Doge Cantarini (5 ft. high),
- The Zisa Hall in Palermo
- The Lions' Court of the Alhambra
- Jerusalem and the Holy Land, comprises 30 designs, published with text and colored plates (London, 1866–67)

== Selected paintings ==
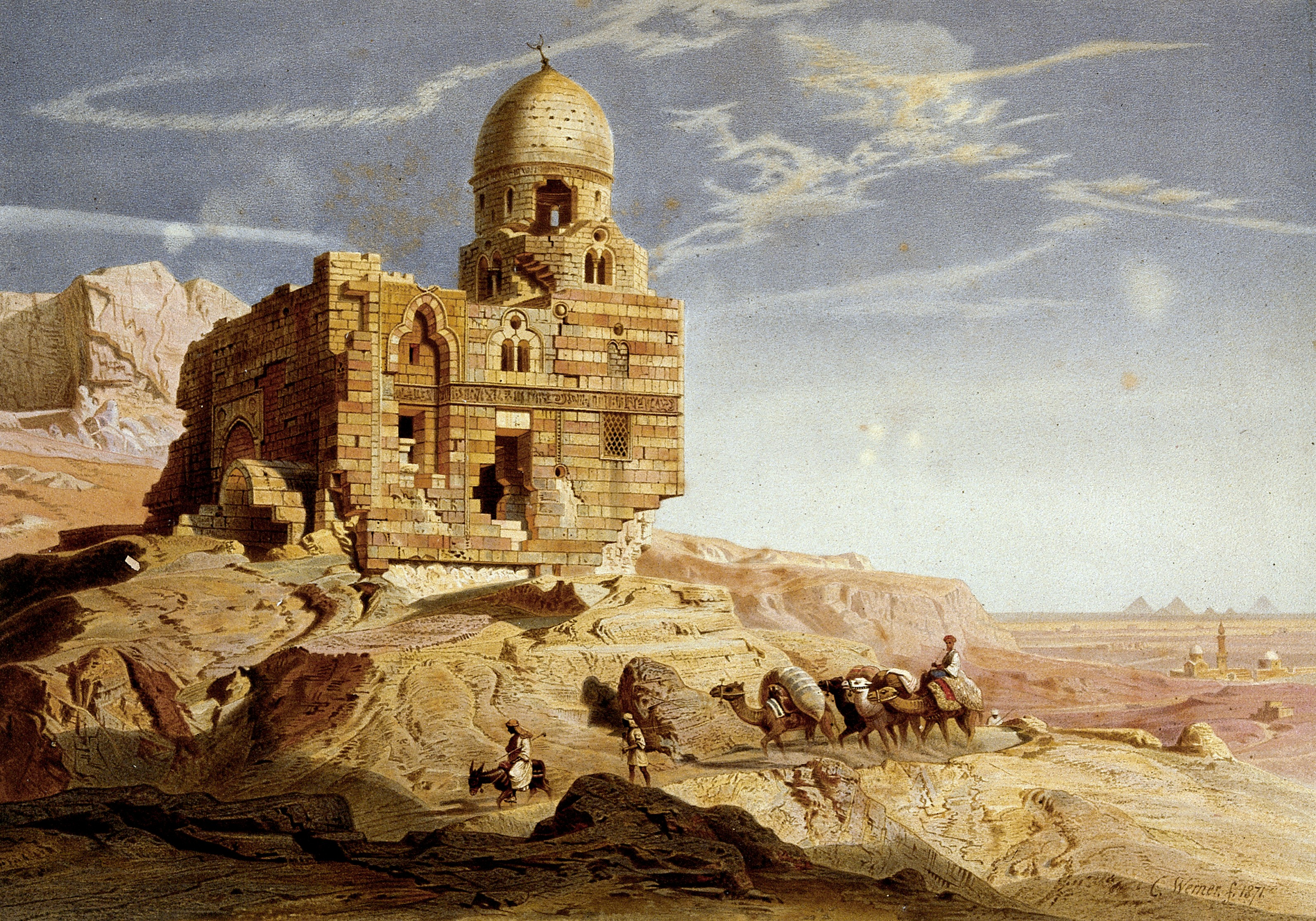
Tomb of Sultan Barsbay

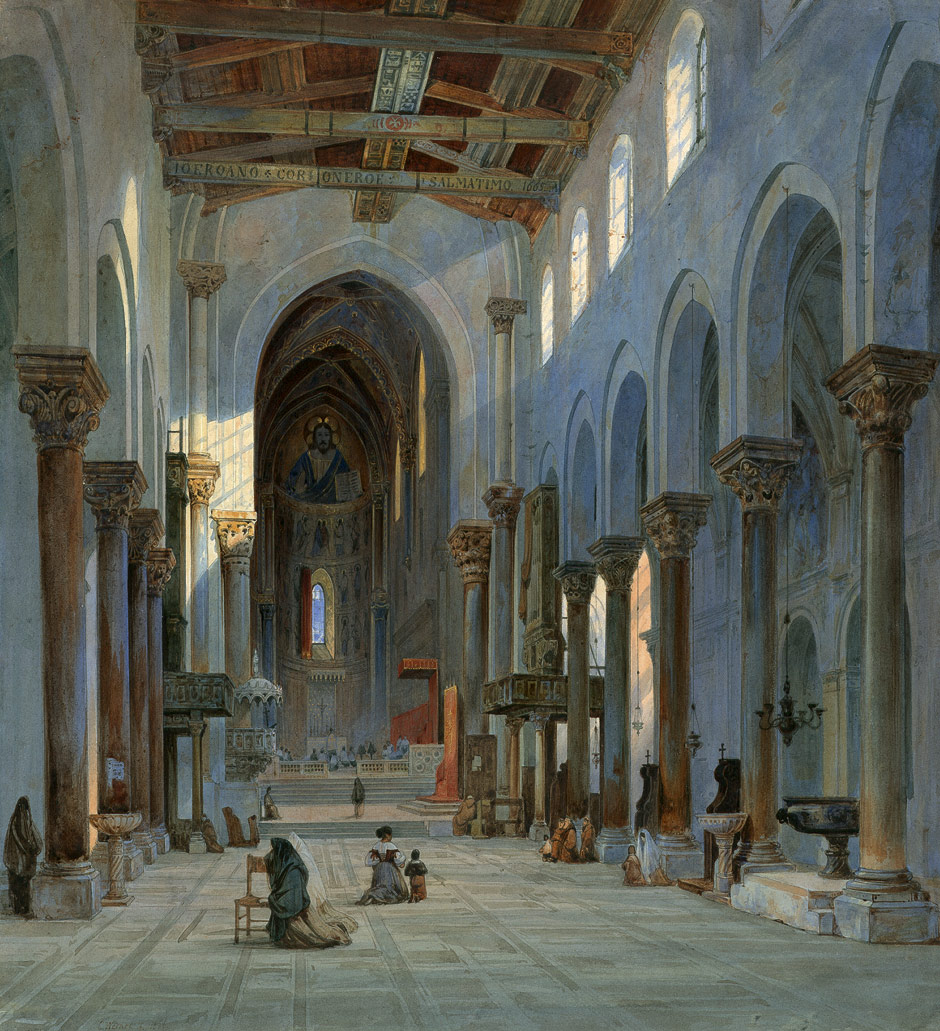
Cefalù Cathedral

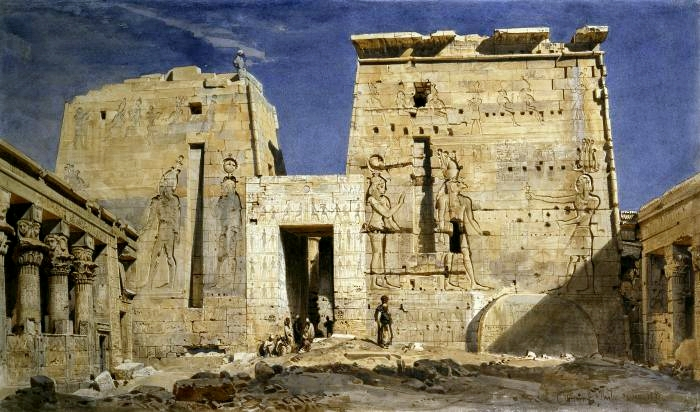
View the Temple of Isis at Philae

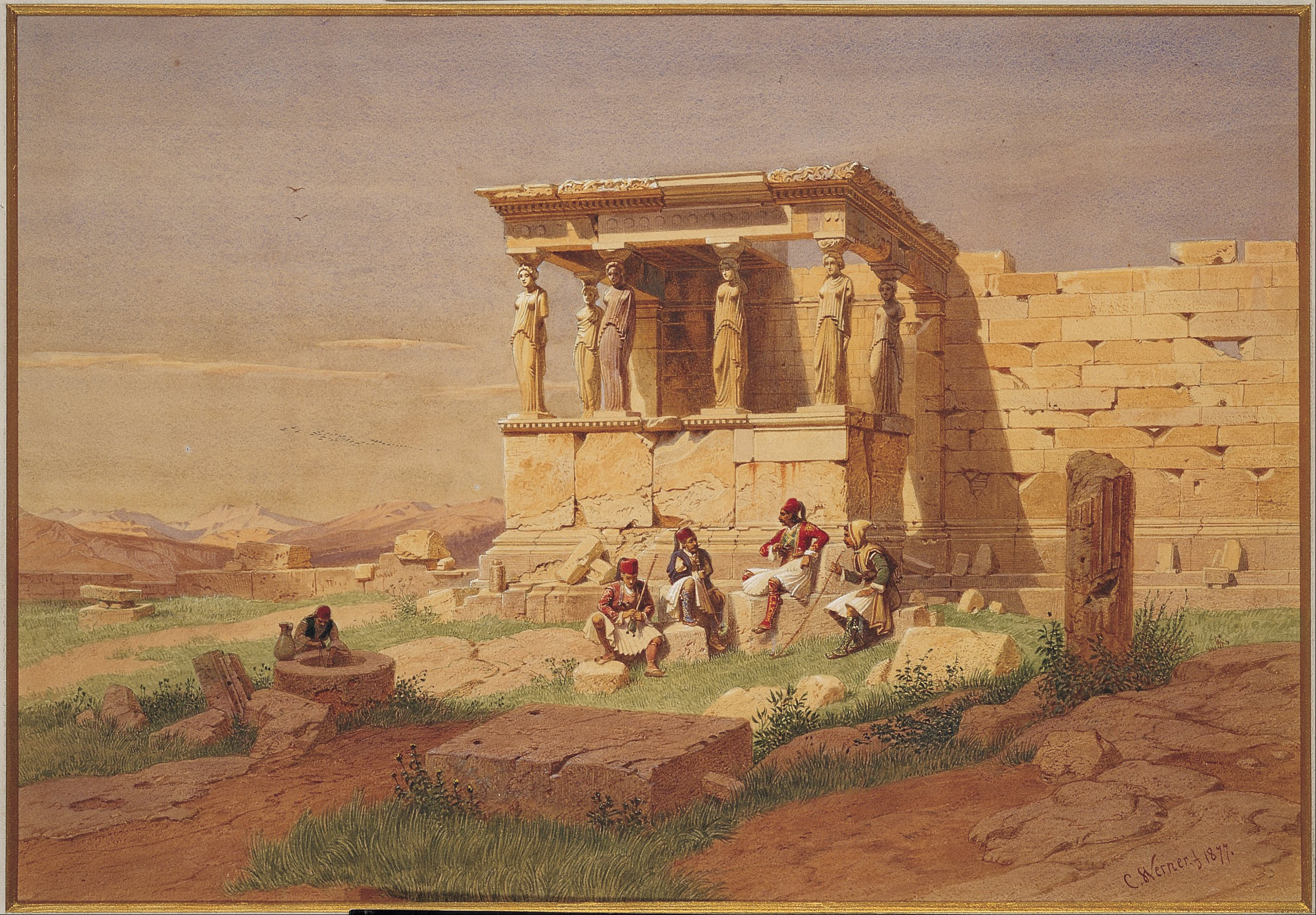
The Portico of the Caryatids on the Erechtheion
