= William Henry James Boot =

English painter

William Henry James Boot (1848 – 8 September 1918) was an English oil and watercolour artist, illustrator and author.

== Biography ==
He was born in Manchester, England, going on to exhibit at the Royal Academy in London (from 1874 to 1884); and becoming a member of the Royal Society of British Artists. He worked for periodicals, including the Illustrated London News and The Art Journal.

Boot was also a member of The Arts Club, who listed him as a "painter and writer on Gothic architecture". He painted landscapes in England, Europe and North Africa, and also provided illustrations for books (see below).

Boot lived in London and married Emily who survived him (d. 1929). They were both buried in Hampstead.

== Illustrated books ==
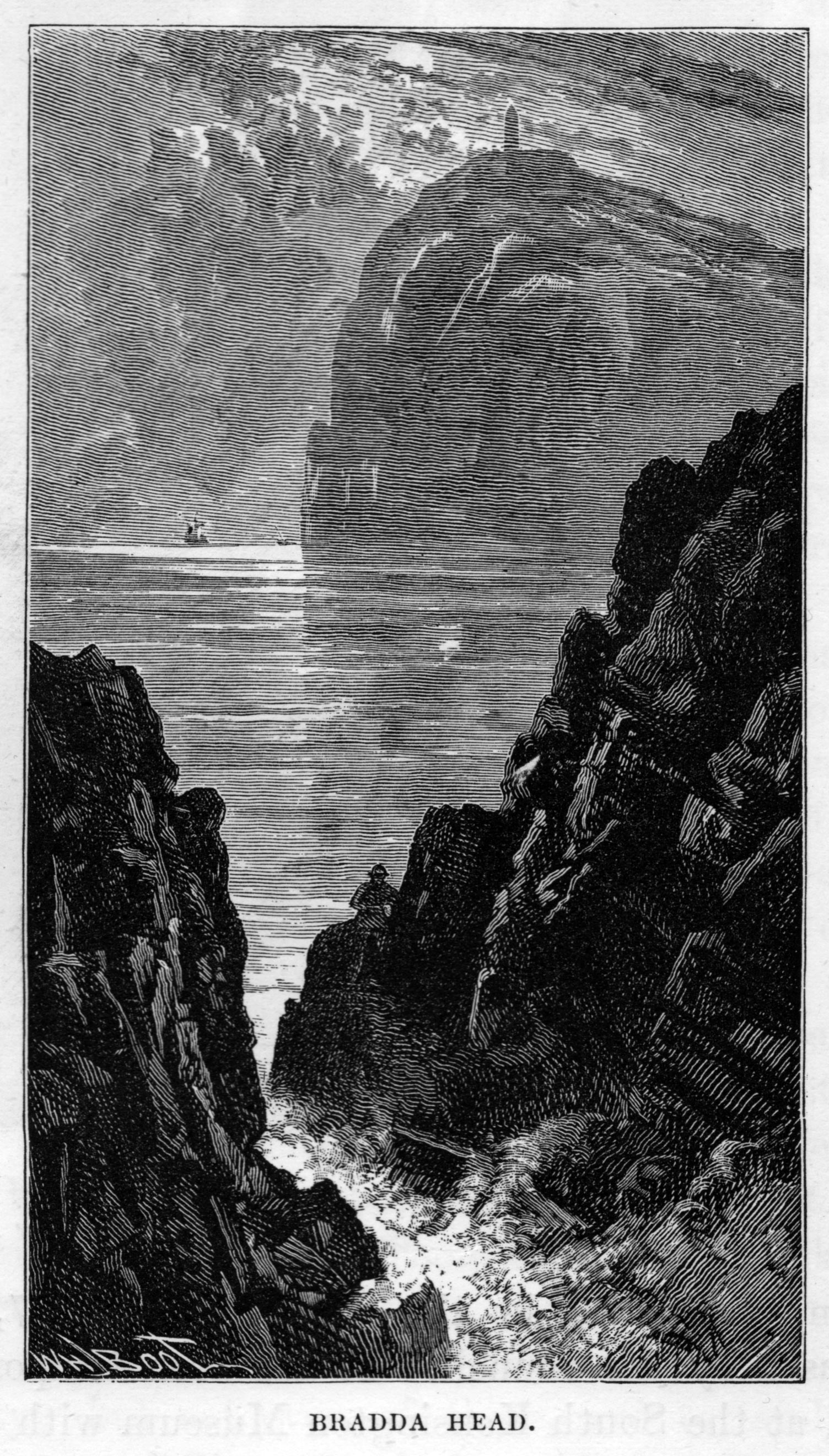
Bradda Head, by Boot

- Boot, W. H. J. Trees and How to paint them in watercolours (Cassell, 1883).
- Mitford, Mary Russell. Our Village ( Sampson, Low, Marston, Searle and Rivington, 1879).
- Walford, Edward. Greater London. A Narrative of Its History, Its People, and Its Places. Vol. 1 (Cassell & Co., 1883), pp frontispiece, 49.
- Walford, Edward. Greater London. A Narrative of Its History, Its People, and Its Places. Vol. 2 (Cassell & Co., 1883), pp 6,7, 13, 42, 43, 66, 84, 91, 115, 121, 150, 193, 198, 210, 235, 241, 252, 258, 271, 289, 295, 318, 330, 354, 360, 396, 420, 456, 462, 492, 511.
- Weston, James. A night in the woods and other tales and sketches (Sampson Low, Marston & Co. Ltd., 1896).
