= John Duke Coleridge =

John Duke Coleridge may refer to

- John Coleridge, 1st Baron Coleridge (1820–1894), an English barrister, judge and politician
- John Coleridge (Indian Army officer) (1878–1951), Indian Army general
- J. D. Coleridge (1879–1934), grandson of the judge, English architect
