= Architecton =

2024 documentary film

- German theatrical release poster
- Directed by: Viktor Kossakovsky
- Written by: Viktor Kossakovsky
- Produced by: Heino Deckert; Charlotte Hailstone
- Cinematography: Ben Bernhard
- Edited by: Viktor Kossakovsky; Ainara Vera
- Music by: Evgueni Galperine
- Production companies: A24; ma.ja.de Filmproduktions-GmbH; Point du Jour International; Les films du Balibari; Hailstone Films
- Distributed by: Neue Visionen Filmverleih (Germany); A24 (United States)
- Release dates: 19 February 2024 (Berlinale); 3 October 2024 (Germany); 1 August 2025 (United States)
- Running time: 98 minutes
- Countries: Germany; France; United States
- Languages: Italian; English
- Box office: $264,856

Architecton is a 2024 documentary film written and directed by Viktor Kossakovsky about concrete and architecture.

The film had its world premiere in the main competition of the 74th Berlin International Film Festival on 19 February 2024, where it was nominated for the Golden Bear and the Berlinale Documentary Film Award. It was released on 3 October 2024 in Germany by Neue Visionen, and was released in the United States on 1 August 2025 by A24.

== Synopsis ==
The movie consists mainly of static shots and drone footage, partly in greyscale, accompanied by music. The movie follows stone and concrete through various stages of its life cycle; containing footage of mountains, quarries, the use of concrete in construction and the eventual demolition of buildings as well as footage of various ruins, both recent and ancient. This is interspersed with footage from a landscape project by Italian architect Michele De Lucchi as well as his visit to the ruins of Temple of Jupiter in Baalbek, Lebanon. The movie features an epilogue consisting of a short dialogue, taking place at the finished landscape project, between the director and De Lucchi about the current stage of architecture and its dependence on concrete.

== Production ==
Architecton was filmed in a schedule of 60 days. It is produced by the German company Ma.ja.de. with the French Point du Jour International and Les films du Balibari in collaboration with A24 and Hailstone Films. ZDF and Arte co-produced the film.

== Release ==
Architecton had its world premiere on 19 February 2024, as part of the 74th Berlin International Film Festival, in Competition. The Cologne-based sales agent The Match Factory secured international sales rights to the film before its Berlinale premiere.

The film had its first screening at CPH:DOX on 18 March 2024 in Artists & Auteurs section. The film was also screened at the 48th Hong Kong International Film Festival on 3 April 2024 in Firebird Awards Documentary competition. It was screened at Lichter Filmfest Frankfurt International, Frankfurt on 19 April 2024. The film was also presented in the International Documentaries section of the 71st Sydney Film Festival on June 6, 2024. The film was also screened in 'Horizons' at the 58th Karlovy Vary International Film Festival on 28 June 2024. It was presented in 'Strands: Thrill' section of the 2024 BFI London Film Festival on 19 October 2024. It was showcased in 'Best of 2024' section of the 19th Rome Film Festival in October 2024. It was also showcased in the official selection out of competition at the Luxembourg City Film Festival on 12 March 2025.

It was theatrically released in Germany on 3 October 2024 by Neue Visionen, and was released in the United States on 1 August 2025.

== Reception ==
On the review aggregator website Rotten Tomatoes, the film has an approval rating of 94% based on 18 reviews, with an average rating of 7.5/10.

Jordan Mintzer reviewing the film for The Hollywood Reporter dubbed it as "Solid as a rock," and opined, "The director’s latest work, Architecton, is more about death than life, capturing the natural and manmade structures formed out of the planet’s bedrock and manipulated over time, destroyed quickly or gradually and then built anew." Mintzer praised the drone photography writing, "If there were ever an Oscar handed out for drone photography, Architecton would win it hands down this year." Giving positive review Mintzer concluded, "At a time when most documentaries, especially those made for streaming services, consist of little to no visual invention, the director has invented and finessed a cinematic language that says more about the world we live in than all the talking heads in all the Netflix docs combined."

Guy Lodge writing in Variety gave positive review and said, "There is no escaping our own mastery, our own determination of what is beautiful and useful, a man-made work that is very much both of those things, Architecton frustratedly awaits a new world order, or at least a new blueprint."

Lee Marshall wrote in ScreenDaily while reviewing the film at Berlinale, "Even before the opening credits have finished rolling, Architecton impresses."

Nicholas Bell in Ion Cinema rated the film with three and half stars and said, "As we drift through the ruins of the past, a portrait emerges juxtaposing the inherent differences regarding the materials and designs of the present."

Reviewing in Polyester, Gregory Coutaut rated the film with 5/6 and wrote, "Architecton takes off from simple capture to give life to a fantastic universe, close to post-apocalyptic science fiction."

Damon Wise for Deadline felt, "This fascinating, engrossing film interrogates the subtext of this seemingly paradoxical statement." He observed, "Such a concept isn’t all that new, but Kossakovsky’s fascinating, magnetic film essay does help us to reassess what we’ve lost over the centuries." Concluding Wise opined, "Architecton verbalizes something we are all thinking in the modern age of war and climate change: what will we leave behind, and what will it say about us to future generations?"

== Accolades ==
The film was selected in Competition at the 74th Berlin International Film Festival, thus it was nominated to compete for Golden Bear award.

Award	Date	Category	Recipient	Result	Ref.
Berlin International Film Festival	25 February 2024	Golden Bear	Architecton	Nominated	
Berlin International Film Festival	25 February 2024	Berlinale Documentary Film Award	Architecton	Nominated	
