= Neue Visionen =

German film distribution company

Neue Visionen Filmverleih GmbH
- Type: GmbH
- Industry: Entertainment
- Founded: 1997; 29 years ago
- Founder: Torsten Frehse; Wulf Sörgel
- Headquarters: Berlin, Germany
- Website: neuevisionen.de

Neue Visionen Filmverleih GmbH is a German film distribution company.

== History ==
Neue Visionen was founded in 1997 by Torsten Frehse and Wulf Sörgel. It joined AG Verleih, an association of German independent film distributors, in 1999.

In 2025, the company launched its own streaming platform, titled Neue Visionen Plus.

== Selected filmography ==
Year	Title	Director	Ref.
1997	Total Therapy	Christian Frosch	
2005	Manderlay	Lars von Trier	
2006	The Wind That Shakes the Barley	Ken Loach	
2008	Elite Squad	José Padilha	
2008	Small Crime	Christos Georgiou	
2010	David Wants to Fly	David Sieveking	
2012	Fuck for Forest	Michał Marczak	
2014	Serial (Bad) Weddings	Philippe de Chauveron	
2014	Memories	Jean-Paul Rouve	
2014	Once in a Lifetime	Marie-Castille Mention-Schaar	
2015	Sweet Bean	Naomi Kawase	
2015	Lamb	Yared Zeleke	
2015	The Sense of Wonder	Éric Besnard	
2015	Halal Love	Assad Fouladkar	
2017	The Young Karl Marx	Raoul Peck	
2018	Aquarela	Viktor Kossakovsky	
2018	Best Intentions	Gilles Legrand	
2020	Tailor	Sonia Liza Kenterman	
2022	Rimini	Ulrich Seidl	
2022	Sparta	Ulrich Seidl	
2023	Club Zero	Jessica Hausner	
2023	The Universal Theory	Timm Kröger	
2024	Architecton	Viktor Kossakovsky	
2025	Sound of Falling	Mascha Schilinski	
2025	A Sad and Beautiful World	Cyril Aris	
2026	The Blood Countess	Ulrike Ottinger	
2026	Fatherland	Paweł Pawlikowski	
2026	It Will Happen Tonight	Nanni Moretti	
2026	Lovebox	Daniela Michel, Alexander Kleider	
