= List of largest monoliths =

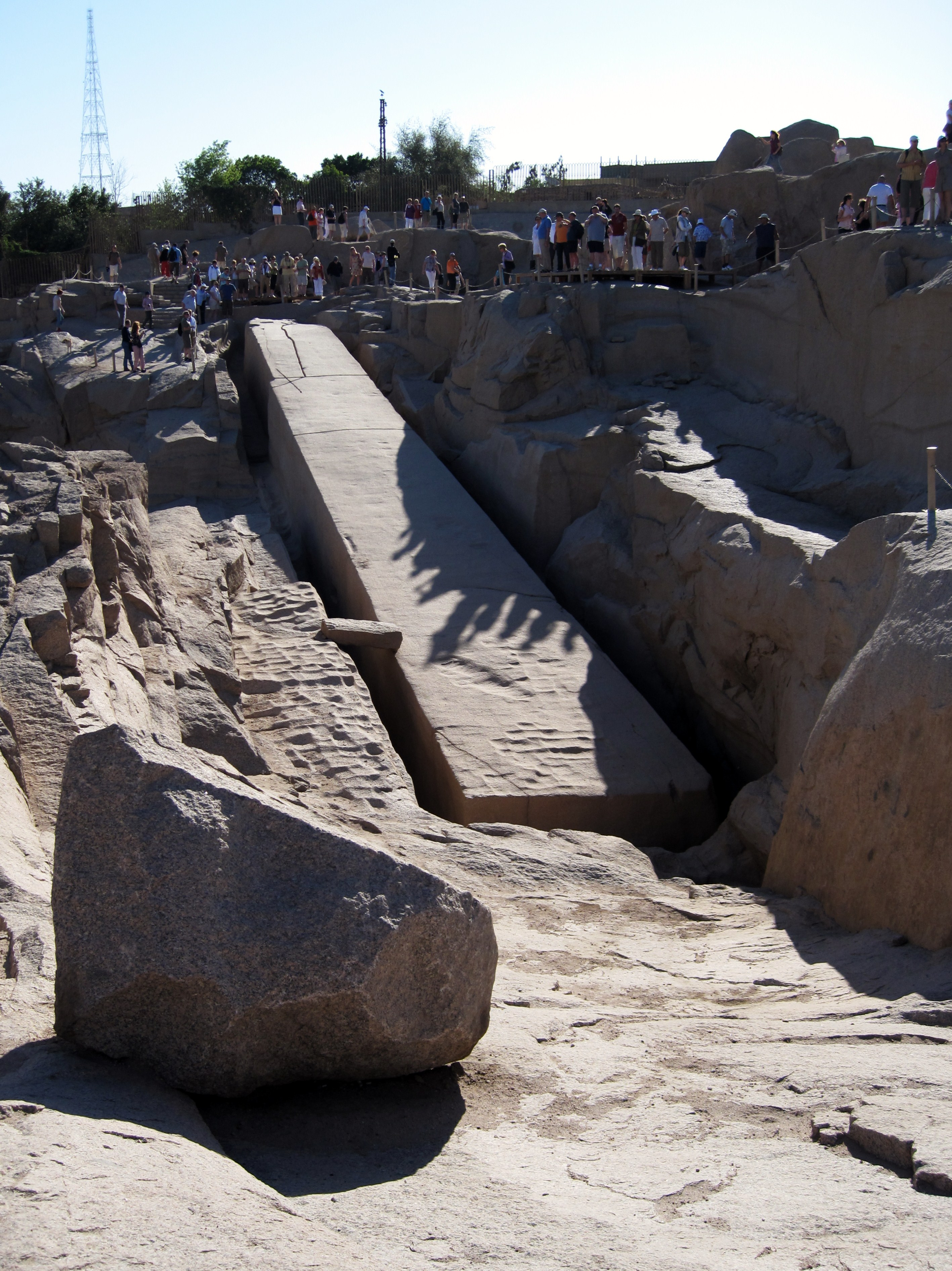
The unfinished obelisk of Aswan

This is a list of monoliths organized according to the size of the largest block of stone on the site. A monolith is a large stone which has been used to build a structure or monument, either alone or together with other stones. In this list at least one colossal stone over ten tons has been moved to create the structure or monument.

In most cases ancient civilizations had little, if any, advanced technology that would help them move these monoliths. The most notable exception is that of the Ancient Egyptians, Ancient Greeks and Romans, who had cranes and treadwheels to help lift colossal stones (see list of ancient Greek and Roman monoliths).

This article also includes a list of modern experimental archaeology efforts to move colossal stones using technologies available to the respective ancient civilizations.

Most of these weights are based on estimates by published scholars; however, there have been numerous false estimates of many of these stones presented as fact. To help recognize exaggerations, an introductory description shows how to calculate the weight of colossal stones from first principles.

== In situ monoliths ==
This section lists monoliths that have been at least partially quarried but not moved.

Weight	Name	Type	Country	Location	Builder	Comment
1,650 t	Forgotten Stone	Block	Lebanon	Baalbek	Roman Empire	19.6 m long, 6 m wide, ≥5.5 m high
1,242 t	Stone of the South	Block	Lebanon	Baalbek	Roman Empire	19.5–20.5 m long, 4.34–4.56 m wide, 4.5 m high
1,100 t	Unfinished obelisk	Obelisk	Egypt	Aswan	Ancient Egypt	41.75 m long, 2.5–4.4 m wide
1,000 t	Stone of the Pregnant Woman	Block	Lebanon	Baalbek	Roman Empire	20.31–20.76 m long, 4–5.29 m wide, 4.21–4.32 m high
400–600 t	Gommateshwara statue	Statue	India	Shravanabelagola of Karnataka	Chavundaraya	60 ft (18 m) tall, over 30 ft (9.1 m) wide
207 t	Granite column	Column	Egypt	Mons Claudianus	Roman Empire	

== Moved monoliths ==
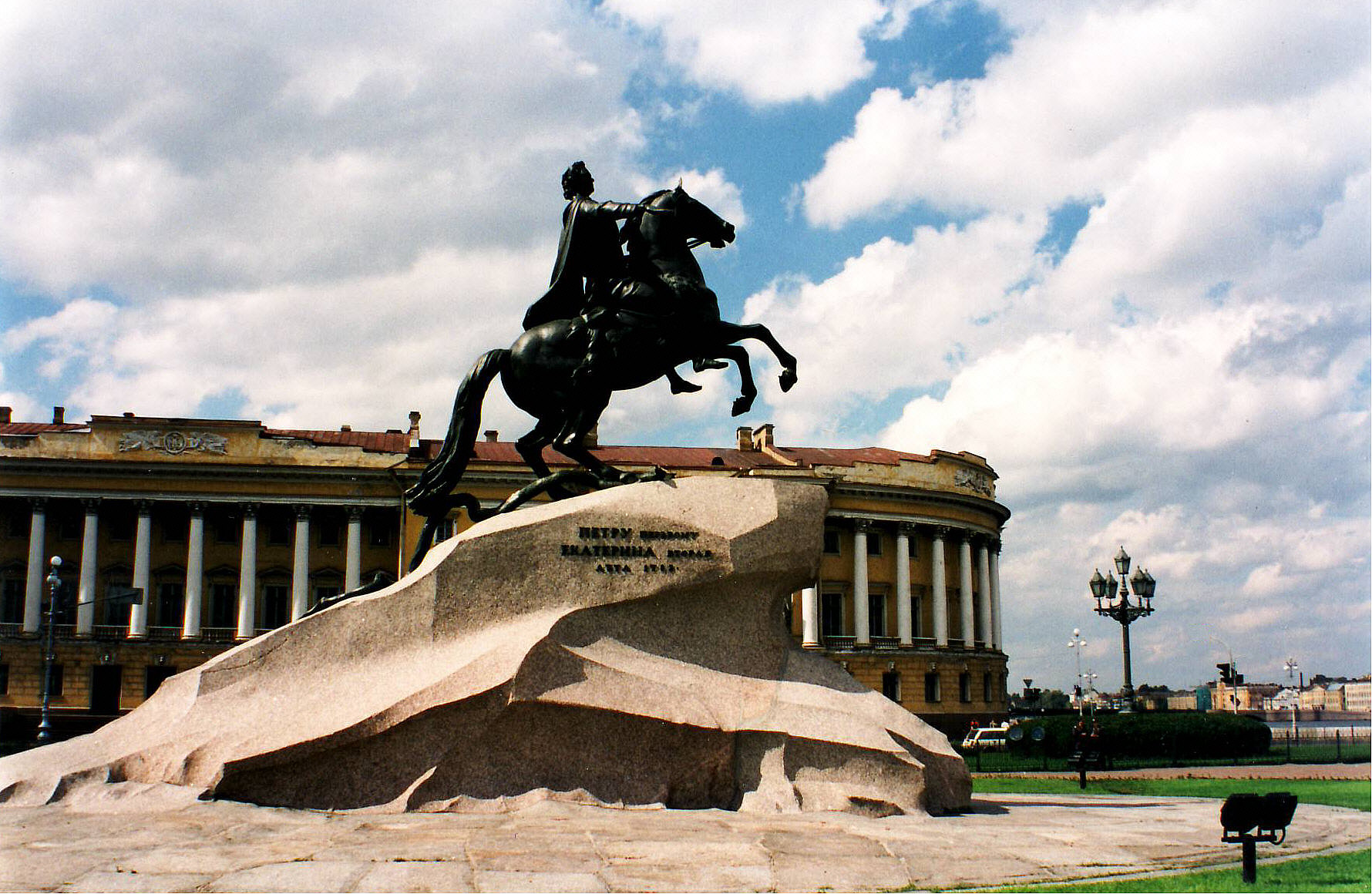
The 1,250 t heavy Thunder Stone in Saint Petersburg, Russia. On top is an equestrian statue of Peter the Great

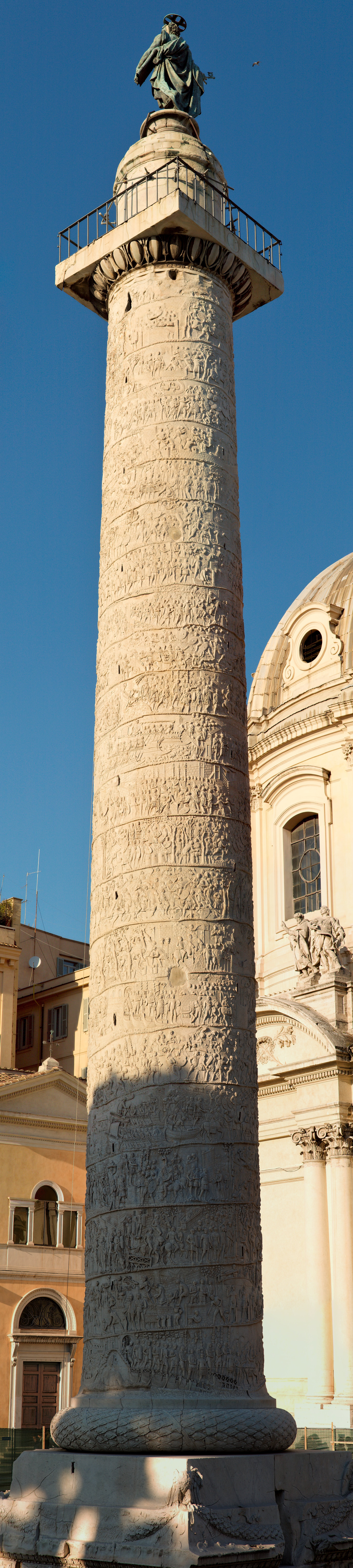
The 53.3 t heavy capital block (the rectangular platform fitted with a railing) of Trajan's Column in Rome, Italy, was lifted by Roman cranes to a record height of about 34 m

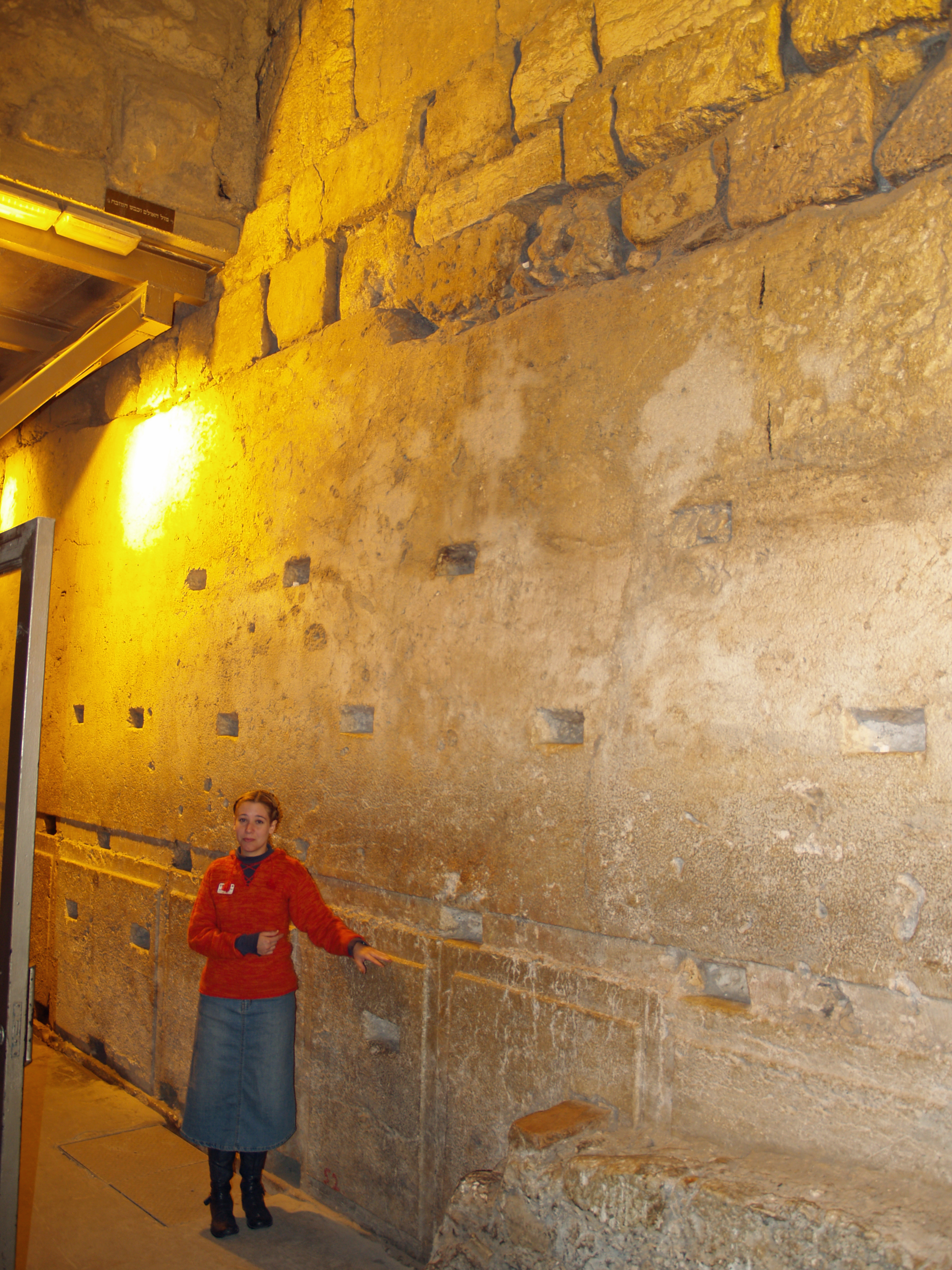
The Western Stone of the Western Wall in Jerusalem weighs 517 t.

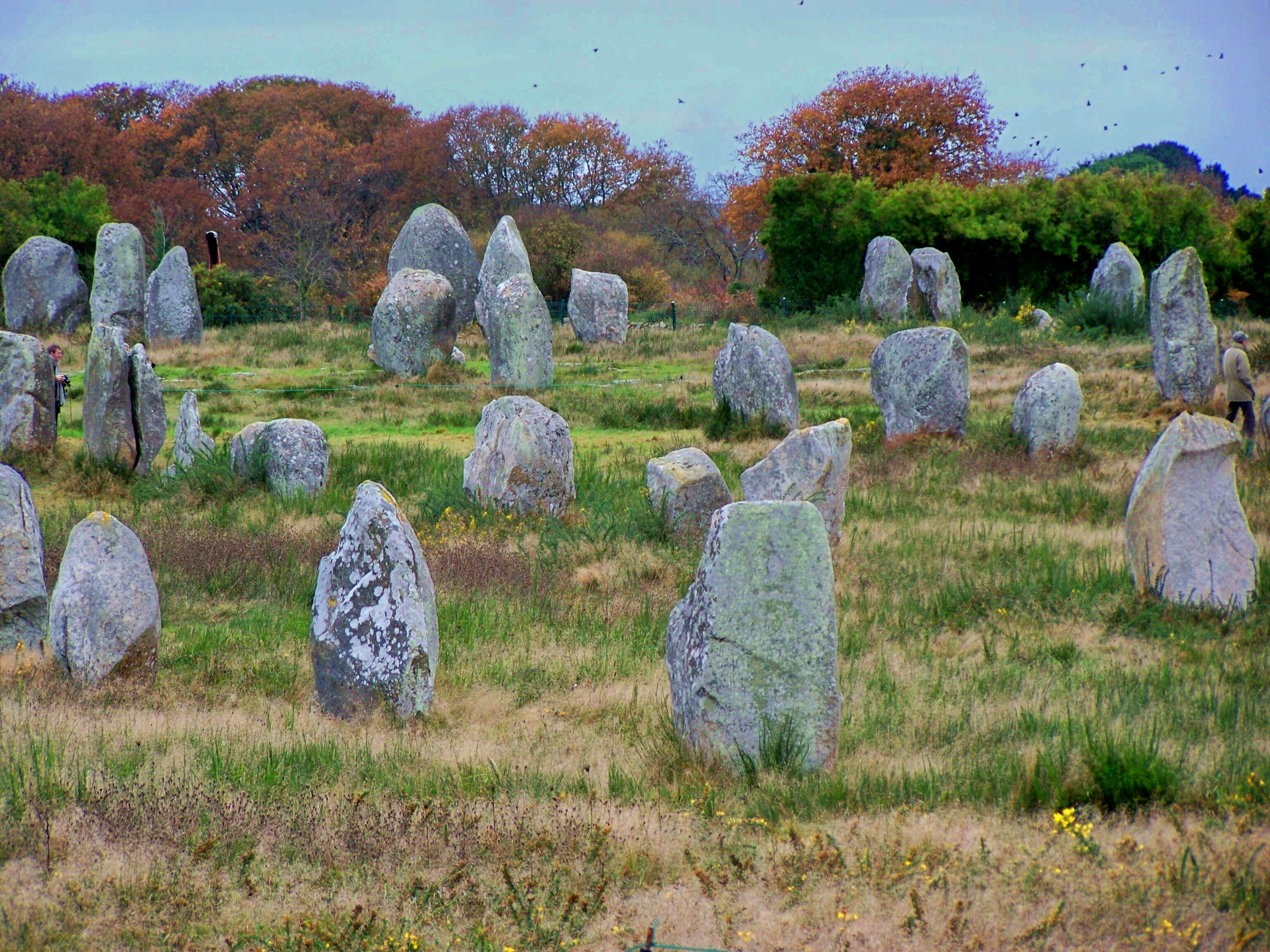
Neolithic Carnac Stones, France

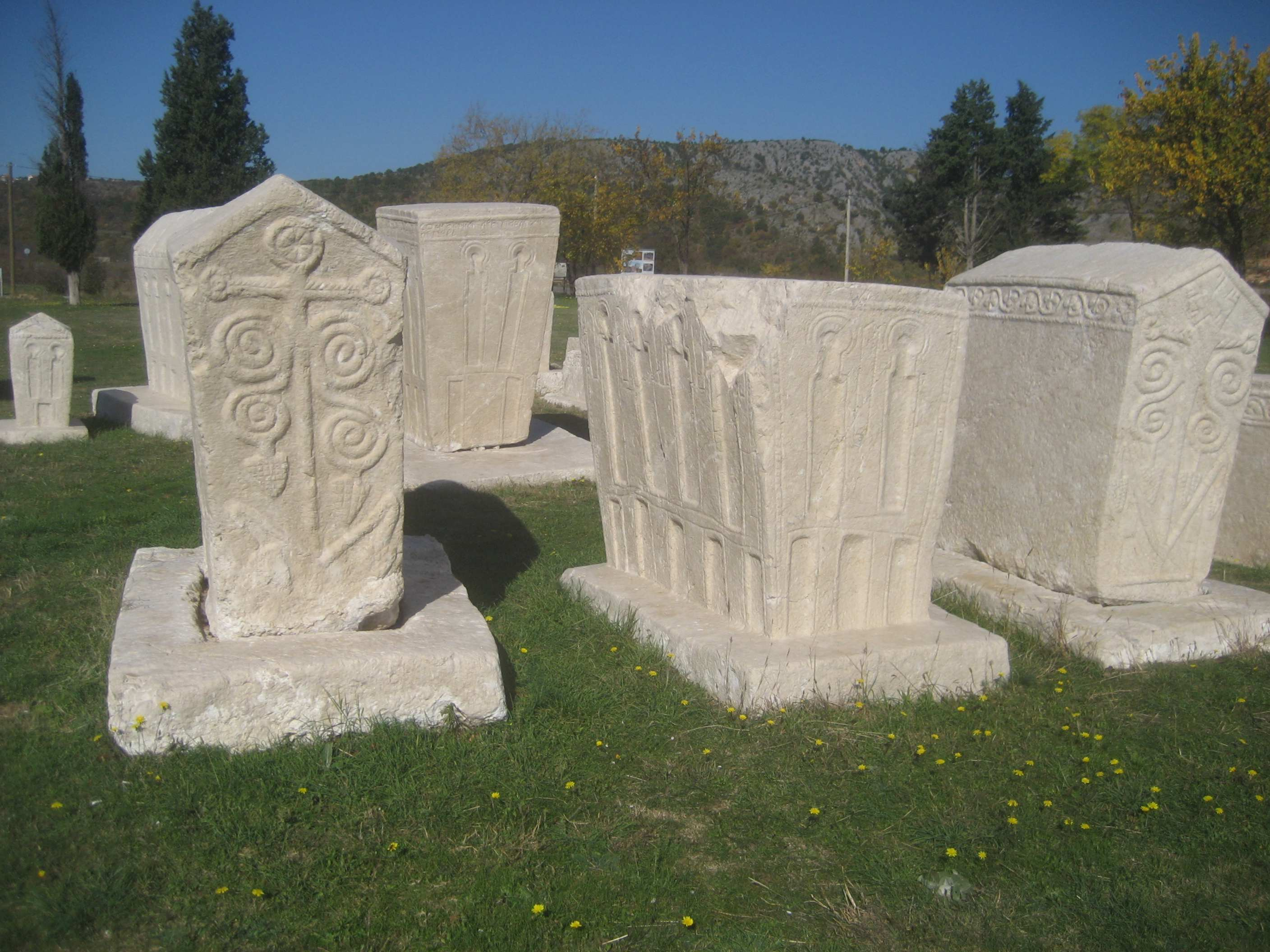
Stećci of medieval Radimlja necropolis, Stolac, Bosnia and Herzegovina

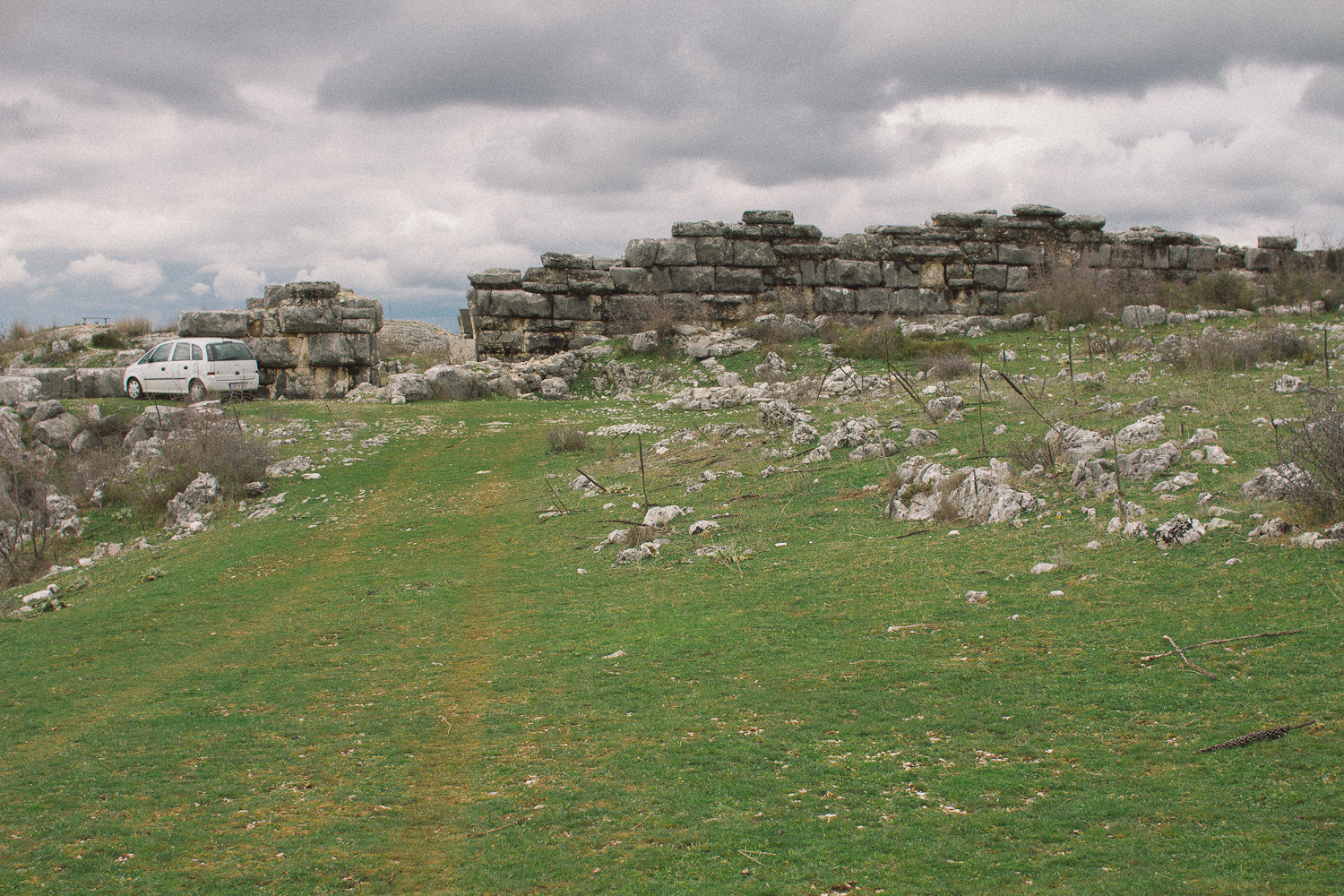
Cyclopean walls of the ancient Illyrian city of Daorson, Stolac, in Bosnia and Herzegovina

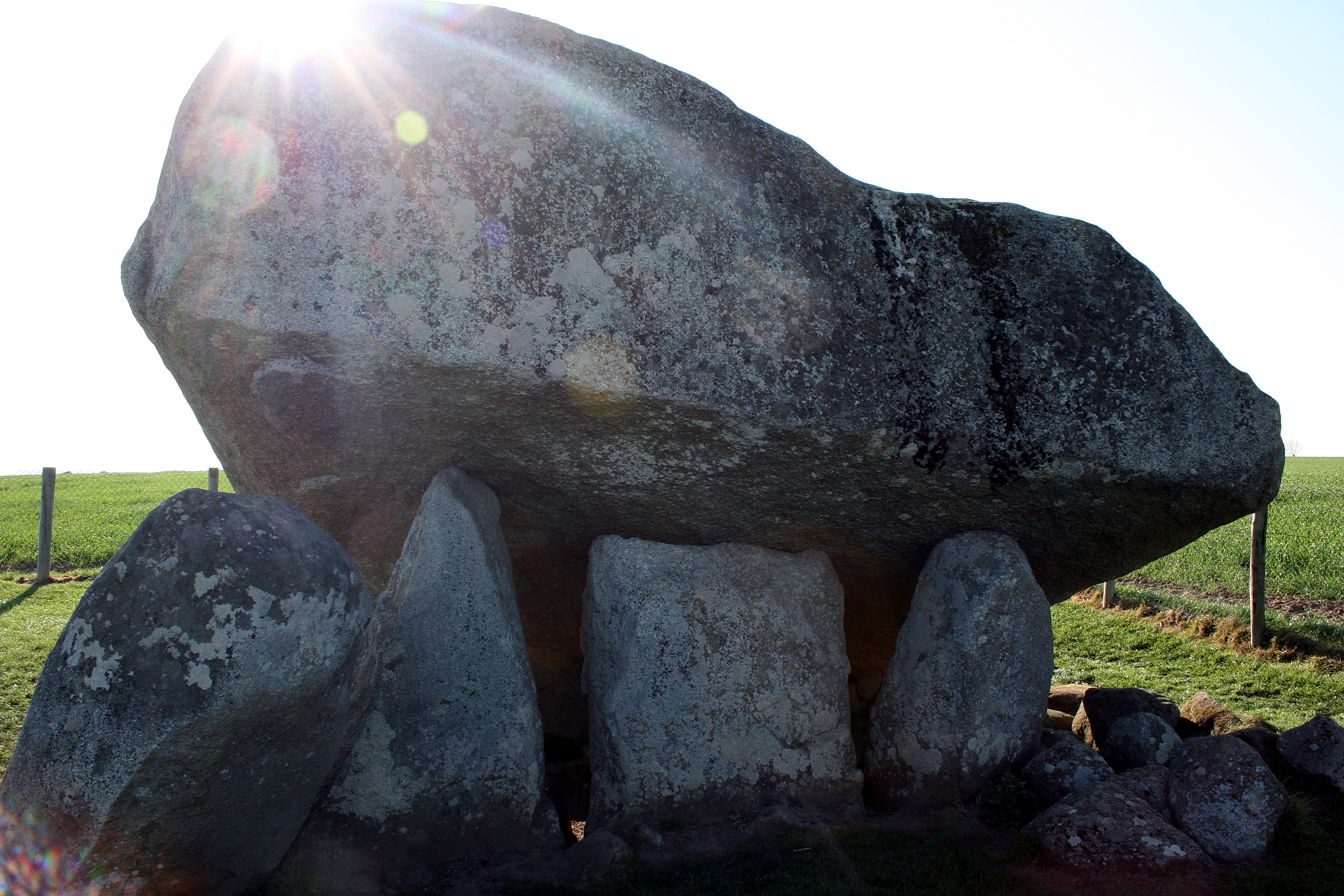
Brownshill Dolmen, Ireland (4th millennium BC). The great capstone weighs about 100 tons.

This section lists monoliths that have been quarried and moved.

Weight	Name/Site	Type	Location	Builder	Comment
1,250 t	Thunder Stone	Boulder, Statue pedestal	Saint Petersburg, Russia	Russian Empire, 1770	Moved 6 km overland for shipment, and cut from 1,500 t to current size in transport
1,000 t	Ramesseum	Statue	Thebes, Egypt	Egyptian Empire	Transported 170 miles (270 km) by ship from Aswan
750 t each	Trilithon (3×)	Blocks	Baalbek, Lebanon	Roman Empire	Plus about 24 blocks about 300 tons each
720 t each	Colossi of Memnon (2×)	Statues	Thebes, Egypt	Egyptian Empire	Transported 420 miles (680 km) from el-Gabal el-Ahmar (near modern-day Cairo) over land without using the Nile.
520 tons, 170 tons, and 160 tons	Great Stele, King Ezana's Stele, Obelisk of Axum	Stelae	Axum, Ethiopia		The stelae were moved about 2.6 miles (4.2 km). King Ezana's stele and the "Obelisk" of Axum were among seven such monuments set up in Axum in the 4th century AD. The Great Stele was never successfully erected and broke into pieces at its present site.
400 t	Temple in complex for Khafre's Pyramid		Giza, Egypt		
300–500 t	Masuda no iwafune		Asuka, Nara, Japan		Large stone structure approximately 11 meters in length, 8 meters in width, and 4.7 meters In height
340 t	Levitated Mass		Los Angeles, California, United States	Sculpture by Michael Heizer, 2012	Moved 106 miles.
330 t	The Broken Menhir of Er Grah	Menhir	Locmariaquer, Brittany, France	Neolithic(4700 BC)	Moved 10–20 km. It once stood but was later broken in 4
250–300 t	Western Stone, Temple Mount	Block	Jerusalem, Israel	Herod, King of Judea during the Second Temple period	Weight is disputed; a 2006 analysis estimated the depth of this stone at only 1.8–2.5 m, for a weight of 250–300 t. Weight formerly said to be 550 to 600 t.
230 t	Mausoleum of Theodoric	Roof slab	Ravenna, Italy	Ostrogothic Kingdom	
220 t	Menkaure's Pyramid		Giza, Egypt	Fourth Dynasty of Egypt	Largest stones in mortuary temple
200 t	Sahure's pyramid		Saqqara, Egypt	Fifth Dynasty of Egypt	Largest stones over king's chamber
200 t	Gochang, Hwasun and Ganghwa Dolmen Sites		Korea		Largest stone at the site
Weight	Name/Site	Type	Location	Builder	Comment

- Colossal statue of Tlaloc, in Coatlinchan. Made of basalt, weighing 168 tons.
- The Kerloas menhir, Brittany, France. Largest, 150 tons.
- Pyramid of Khendjer at Saqqara, Egypt. 150-ton, one-piece quartzite burial chamber.
- Tiwanaku, Bolivia. Several ashlars, 100 to 130 tons, were transported 6 miles (9.7 km).
- Sacsayhuamán, wall near Cusco, Peru. Largest stones over 125 tons.
- Treasury of Atreus at Mycenae, Greece. Largest lintel stone, 120 tons.
- The Pyramid of Amenemhet III, at Hawara, Egypt. 110-ton, one piece quartzite burial chamber.
- Brownshill Dolmen, 100 metric tons.
- Baths of Caracalla, Rome, Italy. Granite columns close to 100 tons.
- Fortress of Mycenae, Greece. Largest stones close to 100 tons.
- Menhir de Champ-Dolent, Brittany, France. Menhir of about 100 tons.
- Pyramid of Nyuserre Ini. 12 megalithic limestone beams 10 meters long weighing 90 tons each, forming the roof of burial chamber and antechamber.
- Moai at Easter Island. Largest moai 70 to 86 tons. The tallest one, Paro, was moved 3.75 miles (6.04 km).
- Great Pyramid of Giza, Egypt. Largest slabs on burial chamber, 80 tons. The granite was transported 580 miles (930 km) from Aswan by barge on the Nile river.
- Karnak, Egypt. Obelisk, 328 tons. Largest architraves, 70 tons. Sandstone transported from Gebel Silsila 100 miles (160 km).
- Trajan's Column, Rome, Italy. Pedestal blocks: 77 t
- Ishibutai Kofun in Asuka, Nara, Japan. Largest stone, 75 tons.
- Pantheon, Rome, Italy. Granite columns, 39 feet (11.8 m) tall, five feet (1.5 m) in diameter, and 60 tons in weight were transported from Egypt by barge.
- Olmec heads, Mexico, gulf coast. Largest Olmec head, almost 50 tons. Transported 37 to 62 miles (100 km).
- Ħaġar Qim, one of the Megalithic Temples of Malta. Its largest stone weighs 57 tons and measures approximately 19 feet (5.8 m) long by 9 feet (2.7 m) tall by 2 feet (0.61 m) thick. The Maltese temples are the oldest free-standing structures on Earth.
- Ashoka Pillars, weighing up to about 50 tons, were transported throughout India to territory ruled by Ashoka.
- Göbekli Tepe, Turkey. Megaliths from 10 to a 50-ton pillar still in its quarry transported up to a 1/4 mile.
- Stonehenge, England. Largest stones over 40 tons were moved 18 miles (29 km); smaller bluestones up to 5 tons were moved 130 miles (210 km).
- Trajan's Column Rome, Italy. Forty-ton drums. The capital block of Trajan's Column weighs 53.3 tons.
- Rameses IV reopened the stone quarries of Wadi Hammamat and had stones dragged 60 miles (97 km) across land to the Nile, then freighted on barges to temples and his tomb in Thebes. Some of these weighed over 40 tons.
- Dur-Sharrukin, Iraq. Largest colossal bull, 40 tons.
- Nineveh, Iraq. Largest colossal bulls, 30 tons each, were transported 30 miles (48 km) from quarries at Balatai, then lifted 65 feet (20 m) once they arrived at the site.
- Nimrud, Iraq. Largest colossal bull, 30 tons.
- Maeshowe Orkney Islands, Scotland. Largest flagstone, 30 tons.
- Caesarea Maritima, harbor of Caesarea, Israel. Largest stone 20 tons.
- Teotihuacan, Mexico. 22-ton water deity on top of the Pyramid of the Moon.
- Aztec calendar stone at Tenochtitlan, Mexico. 24 tons.
- Palenque, Mexico. The largest stones weigh 12 to 15 tons.
- The Parthenon in Athens, Greece. Largest stones 10 tons.
- Nubian pyramids. Sarcophagus, weighing 15.5 tons, and heavier granite statues up to at least 18 feet tall.
- 400 tonne block of the pyramid temple of Khafre.
- Hagia Sophia in Istanbul, Turkey. Columns close to, if not more than, 100 tons.

== Lifted monoliths ==
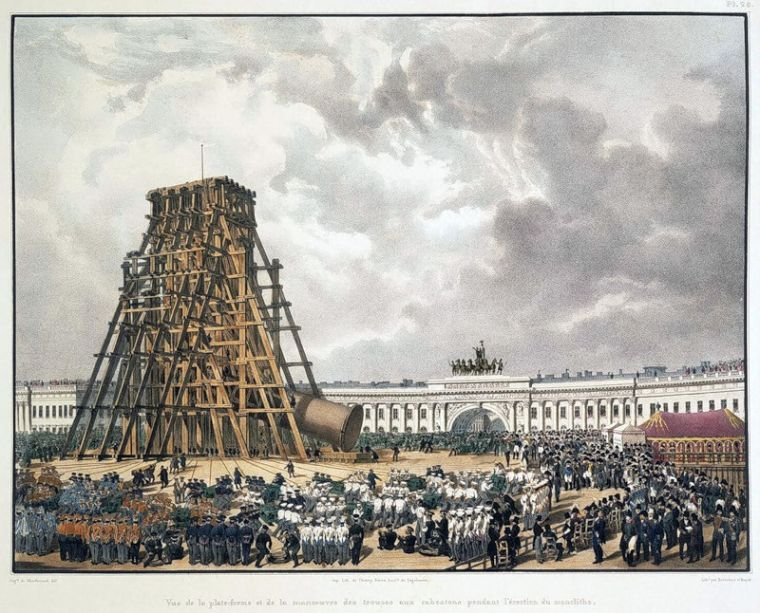
Alexander Column's erection on the Palace Square in Saint Petersburg, Russia (1832)

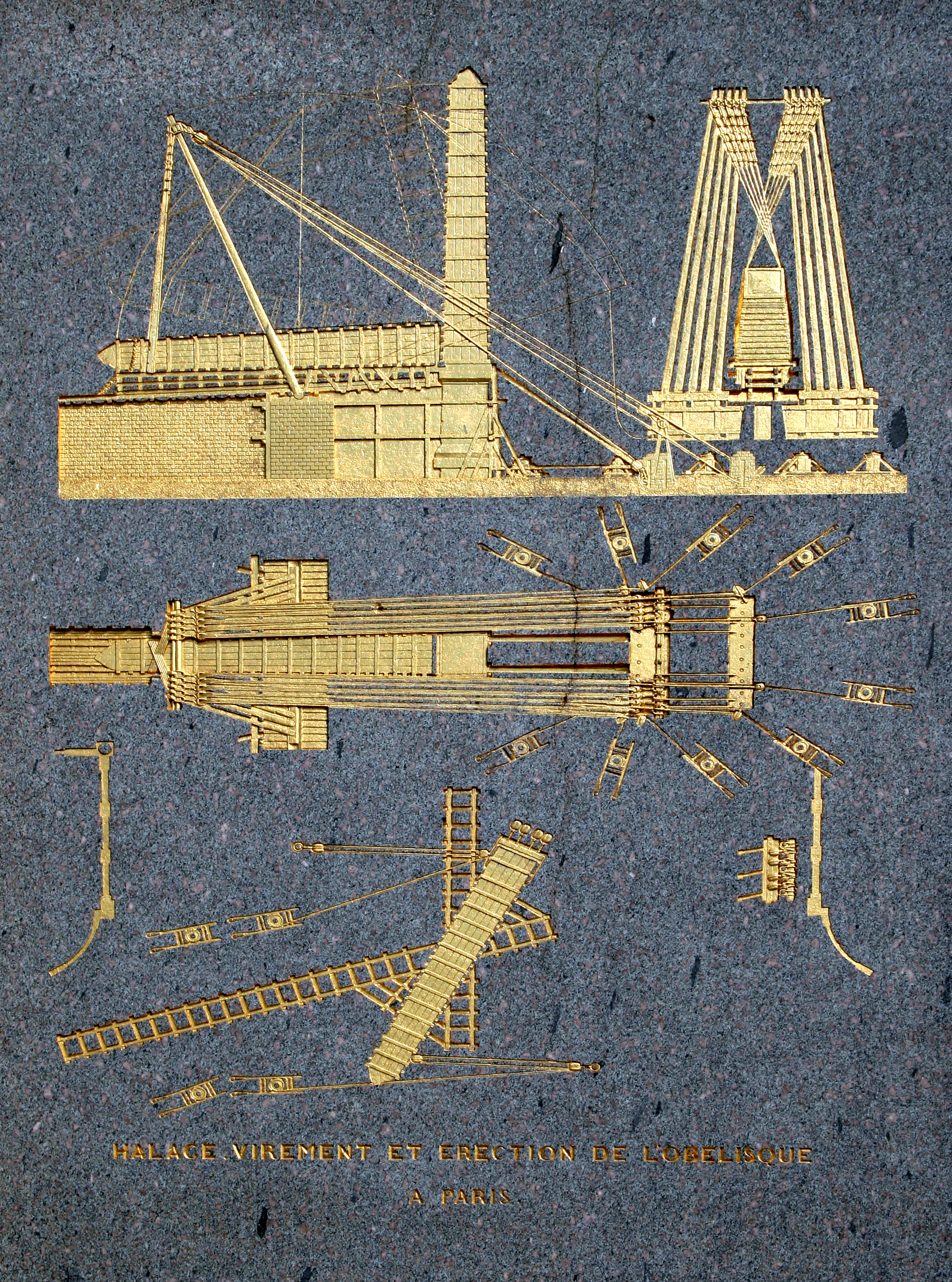
Luxor Obelisk's erection on the Place de la Concorde, Paris (1836)

This section includes monoliths that were quarried, moved and lifted.

=== Erected in upright position ===
Monoliths known to have been lifted into an upright position:

Weight	Name/Site	Type	Location	Builder	Comment
600 t	Alexander Column	Column	Saint Petersburg, Russia	Russian Empire	Lifted in upright position in 1832
455 t	Lateran Obelisk and Obelisk of Theodosius	Pair of Obelisks	Rome, Italy & Istanbul, Turkey	Thutmose III	Lifted in upright position originally in 15th century BC as a pair outside the temple of Amun at Karnak, Thebes; both subsequently shipped to Alexandria in the 4th century AD – one then shipped to Rome and erected in 357 AD by Constantius II and the other to Constantinople and installed in 390 AD by Theodosius I. Both partly broken, now 32.18m (Rome) and 19.6m (Istanbul) high.
361 t	Vatican Obelisk	Obelisk	St. Peter's Square, Vatican City	Ancient Egypt	Removed to Rome in ancient imperial times and re-erected. Relocated in an upright position by Domenico Fontana in 1586 for Pope Sixtus V.
285 t	Pompey's Pillar	Column	Alexandria, Egypt	Diocletian	Column shaft 20.75 m long, of pink granite (lapis syeneites) quarried in Aswan. Erected 298–303 AD and crowned with a grey granite Corinthian capital and 7 m-tall statue in porphyry.
250 t	Luxor Obelisk	Obelisk	Paris, France	Louis-Philippe I	Relocated and lifted in upright position by Apollinaire Lebas in 1836
170 tons & 160 tons	King Ezana's Stele the Obelisk of Axum	Stelae	Axum, Ethiopia	Kingdom of Axum – Ezana of Axum and before.	The stelae were moved about 2.6 miles (4.2 km) from their quarries. They were the largest Axumite stelae to survive installation; larger attempts failed. The "Obelisk" of Axum was removed from a standing position in 1937, cut into five pieces, and taken to Rome to be re-erected. It was again set up in Ethiopia at its original location in 2005.

=== Lifted clear off the ground ===
Monoliths that have been placed on a towering structure:

Weight	Height of the tower	Name/Site	Type	Location	Builder	Comment
80 t	66 m (Vimana)	Brihadisvara Temple	Amalaka block	Thanjavur, Tamil Nadu, India	Chola Empire (1010 AD)	Block of granite, a square of 7.8 m
25 t	66 m (Vimana)	Brihadisvara Temple	Khapuri block	Thanjavur, Tamil Nadu, India	Chola Empire (1010 AD)	Cupolic granite dome

Monoliths known or assumed to have been lifted clear off the ground by cranes into their position:

Weight	Height	Name/Site	Type	Location	Builder	Comment
230 t	~15 m	Mausoleum of Theodoric	Roof slab	Ravenna, Italy	Ostrogothic Kingdom	
108 t	19 m	Jupiter temple	Cornice block	Baalbek, Lebanon	Roman Empire	
63 t	19 m	Jupiter temple	Architrave-frieze block	Baalbek, Lebanon	Roman Empire	
53.3 t	~34 m	Trajan's Column	Capital block	Rome, Italy	Roman Empire	Dedicated in 113 AD

Roman column monuments like Trajan's Column, though not often themselves monolithic, were built using very large sculpted stone blocks, stacked atop one another using cranes and lewises. The capital block of the column was usually even larger and heavier than the column drums. The columns of Marcus Aurelius, Antoninus Pius, and Constantine, and the lost columns of Theodosius, Arcadius, and Leo were all constructed in this way, on monumental pedestals and crowned with colossal statues. A few were monoliths, including the Column of Diocletian in Alexandria, called "Pompey's Pillar", the "Column of the Goths" and the Column of Marcian in Constantinople, and the lost Column of Antoninus Pius in Rome.

== List of efforts to move and install stones ==
These are listed with the largest experiments or efforts to move megaliths with ancient technology, the ones from the nineteenth century weren't intended as experiments, but they didn't have more advanced technology; for additional details of most experiments see related pages.

- Marinos Carburis, a Greek lieutenant-colonel in the Russian Army, organized the move of an enormous boulder called the Thunder Stone (Russian, Гром-Камень) from the Gulf of Finland in 1768 to Saint Petersburg, Russia for the purpose of using it as a pedestal for the Bronze Horseman statue. The mass of the Thunder Stone has been estimated to be around 1500 tons. This was done by rolling it on bronze ball bearings on a track. It took an estimated 400 men nine months to move it.
- In 1997, Julian Richards teamed up with Mark Witby and Roger Hopkins to conduct several experiments to replicate the construction at Stonehenge for NOVA's Secrets of Lost Empires mini-series. They initially failed to tow a 40-ton monolith with 130 men but after adding additional men towing as well as some men using levers to prod the megalith forward, they succeeded in inching it forward a small distance.
- Roger Hopkins and Mark Lehner teamed up with a NOVA crew to conduct an obelisk-erecting experiment; they successfully erected a 25-ton obelisk in 1999. They also managed to tow it a short distance.
- Thor Heyerdahl organized an effort to pull a 10-ton Moai on a sledge with a group of 180 men. This effort used 18 men per ton. He also conducted an experiment to erect a 10-ton Moai successfully. This experiment also shows the same methods could be used to lift a megalith of that size onto a sledge; most other experiments to move them on sledges failed to explain how they got them on the sledge, and one organized by Jo Anne Van Tilburg, even showed them using a crane to get it on the sledge.
- Charles Love experimented with a 10-ton replica of a Moai on Easter Island. His first experiment found rocking the statue to walk it was too unstable over more than a few hundred yards. He then found that by placing the statue upright on two sled runners atop log rollers, 25 men were able to move the statue 150 feet (46 m) in two minutes. This effort used 2.5 men per ton.
- Austen Henry Layard organized an effort to transport two 10-ton colossal statues of a winged lion and a winged bull with a group of 300 men in 1847. He loaded them on a wheeled cart and towed them from Nimrud to the river and loaded on a barge, where it was sent to London. This effort used 30 men per ton.
- Paul Emile Botta and Victor Place attempted to move two additional 30-ton colossi to Paris from Khorsabad in 1853. To facilitate their shipment to Paris, they were sawn in pieces, but were still too heavy for the methods employed. One of the pieces fell into the Tigris River, never to be retrieved. The other made it to Paris.
- Giovanni Battista Belzoni organized an effort to pull a 7.5-ton fragment of a statue of Ramses on rollers with a group of 130 men in 1815. This statue was towed to the river and loaded on a barge, where it was sent to London. Progress increased with practice as they went along. This effort used 17 or 18 men per ton.
- Henri Chevrier organized an effort to pull a 6-ton block on a sledge with a group of six men. This effort used 1 man per ton. Other reports claim that Chevier's experiment required 3 men per ton.
- Josh Bernstein and Julian Richards organized an effort to pull a 2-ton stone on wooden tracks with a group of about 16 men. This effort used 8 men per ton.
- Mark Lehner and NOVA organized an experiment to tow stones and to build a pyramid 9 meters wide by 9 meters deep by 6 meters high. They were able to tow a 2-ton block on a sledge across wood tracks with 12 to 20 men. This effort used 6 to 10 men per ton. The pyramid was 54 cubic meters total estimated weight 135 tons. It was built out of 186 stones. The average weight of each stone was almost 1,500 lb (680 kg) (.75 tons). They found that four or five men could use levers to flip stones less than a ton and roll them to transport them. 44 men took 22 days to complete the pyramid, including the carving of the stones. However, they used iron to carve the stones, which was not widely used in Ancient Egypt; copper was typically used. They also used a modern front end loader to accelerate the work on the lower courses. They were unable to use the front end loader to install the capstone, since it was too high; they had to use levers to raise it to 20 feet (6.1 m).
- In a 2001 exercise, an attempt was made to transport a large stone along a land and sea route from Wales to Stonehenge. Volunteers pulled it for some miles (with great difficulty) on a wooden sledge over land, using modern roads and low-friction netting to assist sliding, but once transferred to a replica prehistoric boat, the stone sank in Milford Haven before it even reached the rough seas of the Bristol Channel.
- Roger Hopkins and Vince Lee both theorized about how the megalithic stones were moved at Baalbek; these theories involved either towing them or flipping them.
- Vince Lee participated in experiments to test his theories about how the walls of Sacsayhuamán were built.

== Calculating the weight of monoliths ==
In the cases of smaller monoliths it may be possible to weigh them. However, in most cases monoliths are too large or they may be part of an ancient structure so this method cannot be used. The weight of a stone can be calculated by multiplying its volume and density. Each of these presents challenges.

=== Volume ===
To obtain accurate estimates, one needs to survey the monolith, including realistic and explicit assessment of the shapes of inaccessible portions, and then calculate the volume and estimate volumetric errors, which vary crudely as the cube of linear uncertainties.

=== Density ===
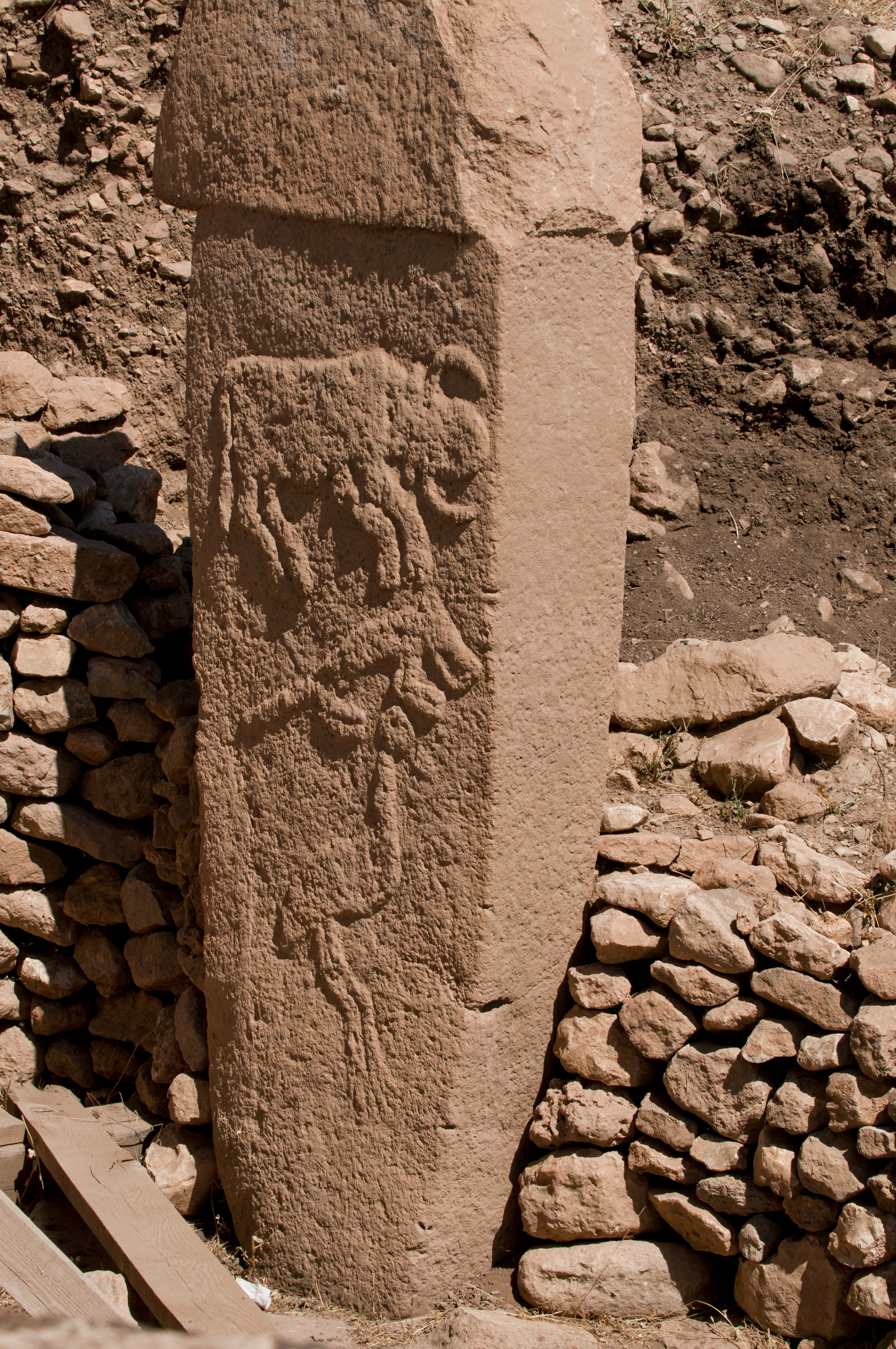
Monolith with bull, fox, and crane in low relief at Göbekli Tepe

The density of most stone is between 2 and 3 tons per cubic meter. Basalt weighs about 2.8 to 3.0 tons per cubic meter; granite averages about 2.75 metric tons per cubic meter; limestone, 2.7 metric tons per cubic meter; sandstone or marble, 2.5 tons per cubic meter. Some softer stones may be lighter than 2 tons per cubic meter; for example, volcanic tuff or some types of sandstone weigh about 1.9 tons per cubic meter. Since the density of most of these stones varies, it is necessary to know the source of the stone to obtain accurate measurements. Identifying the rock type alone is not sufficient, as this table illustrates:

Densities of common rocks in g/cm^{3} or tons/m^{3}
Material	Density
Sediments	1.7–2.3
Sandstone	1.9–2.7
Shale	2.0–2.7
Limestone	2.5–2.8
Granite	2.5–2.8
Metamorphic rock	2.6–3.0
Basalt	2.7–3.1

Simply identifying the monolith as sandstone would allow a ± 15% uncertainty in the weight estimate. In practice, one would measure the density of the monolith itself, and preferably document any variation in density within the monolith, as it may not be homogeneous. Non-destructive methods of density measurements are available (e.g., electron back-scatter); alternatively, the site may contain already-separated fragments of the monolith which can be used for laboratory measurements or on-site techniques. At the crudest, a weighing device and a bucket can obtain two significant figures for a density value.

== See also ==
- List of colossal sculpture in situ
- List of megaliths
- Rock-cut architecture
- Megalithic sites of Charente

== Sources ==
- Adam, Jean-Pierre (1977), "À propos du trilithon de Baalbek: Le transport et la mise en oeuvre des mégalithes", Syria, 54 (1/2): 31–63, doi:10.3406/syria.1977.6623
- Coulton, J. J. (1974), "Lifting in Early Greek Architecture", The Journal of Hellenic Studies, 94: 1–19, doi:10.2307/630416, JSTOR 630416, S2CID 162973494
- Heidenreich, Robert; Johannes, Heinz (1971), Das Grabmal Theoderichs zu Ravenna, Wiesbaden: Franz Steiner
- Klemm, Rosemarie; Klemm, Dietrich D. (1993), Steine und Steinbrüche im Alten Ägypten, Berlin: Springer, ISBN 3-540-54685-5
- Lancaster, Lynne (1999), "Building Trajan's Column", American Journal of Archaeology, 103 (3): 419–439, doi:10.2307/506969, JSTOR 506969, S2CID 192986322
- Maxfield, Valerie A. (2001), "Stone Quarrying in the Eastern Desert with Particular Reference to Mons Claudianus and Mons Porphyrites", in Mattingly, David J.; Salmon, John (eds.), Economies Beyond Agriculture in the Classical World, Leicester-Nottingham Studies in Ancient Society, vol. 9, London: Routledge, pp. 143–170, ISBN 0-415-21253-7
- Ruprechtsberger, Erwin M. (1999), "Vom Steinbruch zum Jupitertempel von Heliopolis/Baalbek (Libanon)", Linzer Archäologische Forschungen, 30: 7–56
- Scaife, C. H. O. (1953), "The Origin of Some Pantheon Columns", The Journal of Roman Studies, 43 (1–2): 37, doi:10.2307/297777, JSTOR 297777, S2CID 161273729
- Scarre, Chris, ed. (1999). The Seventy Wonders of the Ancient World: The Great Monuments and How They Were Built. Thames & Hudson. ISBN 978-0500050965.
