= Holy Wood Dust =

2026 documentary film by Viktor Kossakovsky

- Directed by: Viktor Kossakovsky
- Written by: Viktor Kossakovsky
- Starring: Stefano Mancuso
- Cinematography: Gianmarco Donaggio
- Edited by: Ainara Vera
- Production companies: Be Water Film; Rai Cinema; Solaria Film; Oceanika; Allegra Films; Doppelplusultra Filmproduktion
- Release date: 6 September 2026 (Venice)
- Running time: 100 minutes
- Countries: Italy; Spain; Germany
- Language: Italian

Holy Wood Dust team photo call at the 83rd Venice International Film Festival

Holy Wood Dust is a 2026 documentary film written and directed by Viktor Kossakovsky. A co-production of Italy, Spain, and Germany, it explores the life of trees and plants and examines the relationship between humans and the natural world, with the participation of the Italian botanist Stefano Mancuso.

The film had its world premiere out of competition at the 83rd Venice International Film Festival on 6 September 2026.

== Production ==
The film was produced primarily in Italy by Be Water Film with Rai Cinema. The production received support from several institutions, including Italy's Ministry of Culture, ICAA, ICEC and the MOIN Film Fund Hamburg Schleswig-Holstein, as well as support from the Lazio regional film programme. It had the working title Tears for Fears.

== Release ==
The film was selected for the Venice Open – Out of Competition section of the 83rd Venice International Film Festival, and premiered on 6 September 2026.

== Reception ==
The Hollywood Reporter's Leslie Felperin described the film as "another [Kossakovsky's] distinctive non-fiction meditation on a theme, a work that’s eloquent even if the author’s message is not always explicitly articulated." Jo-Ann Titmarsh from Next Best Picture praised it, noting that "without subjecting his audience to a lecture, Kossakovsky has brilliantly and effectively communicated everything he wanted to say and he has done so through the silent eloquence of those trees. All we need to do is listen."

Jonathan Romney from Screen International panned the film, noting that while "there is ample magnificence and visual mischief on display", and "undeniable beauty throughout, and formidable tech mastery", Kossakovsky's "science-inspired, emotionally-charged approach feels excessively rhetorical" and "lacks the genuinely revelatory magic" of his best works.
