= Eurasia (TV series) =

- Title card
- Also known as: Eurasia: The Conquest of the East; Eurasian Empires
- French: Eurasia : À la conquête de l'Orient
- Genre: Documentary
- Written by: Alain Moreau
- Directed by: Patrick Cabouat
- Narrated by: France: Maryse Lefebvre; Pierre Sciama; Japan: Sanae Ueda; Shinichi Taketa
- Composers: France: Marc Hillmann; Bernard Becker; Japan: Takefumi Haketa
- Countries of origin: France; Japan
- Original languages: French; Japanese
- No. of series: 1
- No. of episodes: 8

Production
- Producers: NHK; Point du Jour
- Running time: 48 minutes

Original release
- Network: NHK; France 5
- Release: 20 April – 14 December 2003

Eurasia: The Conquest of the East (French: Eurasia : À la conquête de l'Orient; Japanese: 文明の道, romanized: Bunmei no Michi, lit. 'Road of Civilisation'), also known as Eurasian Empires or simply Eurasia, is a documentary TV series about the Eurasian civilisations, which ran in eight episodes on NHK (2003) and France 5 (2004). It started on 20 April 2003, with the final episode broadcast on 14 December 2003. The series has been dubbed into English and Spanish.

== Synopsis ==
New discoveries and studies have shown that Central Asia, a region located in the centre of Eurasia, played a significant role as a "cradle of civilisation". The civilisations brought to the vast Eurasian continent by conquest and trade continued to collide and fuse, affecting each other and developing new civilisations. Computer-generated imagery is used to recreate the historical scenes of Ai-Khanoum, Babylon, Baghdad, Persepolis, Rome, etc., representing the rise and fall of a dynamic civilisation that took place over 2000 years.

== Episodes ==
#	Title	French title	Japanese title	Directed by	Original air date
1	Alexander the Great	Alexandre le Grand	アレクサンドロス大王 ペルシャ帝国への挑戦	Patrick Cabouat, Atsushi Ogaki, Atsushi Murayama, Satoru Nagai, Masakazu Taniguchi	20 April 2003
2	The Forgotten Alexandria	L'Alexandrie oubliée	アレクサンドロスの遺産 最果てのギリシャ都市	Patrick Cabouat, Noriaki Hashimoto, Atsushi Murayama	18 May 2003
3	Ghandhara: The Renaissance of Buddhism	Gandhara, l'envol du bouddhisme	ガンダーラ・仏教飛翔の地	Patrick Cabouat, Kazuko Oka	15 June 2003
4	The Romans in China	Des Romains au cœur de la Chine	地中海帝国ローマ・東方への夢	Patrick Cabouat, Atsushi Ogaki	20 July 2003
5	The Caravaneers of the Silk Road	Les Maîtres des caravanes	シルクロードの謎 隊商の民ソグド	Patrick Cabouat, Noriaki Hashimoto	14 September 2003
6	Baghdad in the Year 1000	Bagdad, an 1000	バグダッド 大いなる知恵の都	Patrick Cabouat, Kaoru Kawada, Atsushi Murayama	12 October 2003
7	Jerusalem 1227: The Excommunicated Peace	Jérusalem 1227 : la paix excommuniée	エルサレム 和平･若き皇帝の決断	Patrick Cabouat, Kazuko Oka	16 November 2003
8	The Mongol Conqueror: Kublai Khan's Dream	Le Rêve mongol	クビライの夢 ユーラシア帝国の完成	Patrick Cabouat, Masakazu Taniguchi	14 December 2003

== DVD ==
The series has been released on DVD by TF1 vidéo in 2004. A new edition titled Eurasia : Orient et Occident, 2500 ans d'histoire et de conquêtes, has been released in 2006. The Japanese DVD box has been released in 2004, by NHK software.

== Adaptation ==
The series has been adapted into two comic books and a book series consisting of five volumes, published between 2003 and 2004 by NHK Publishing.

Comic books

- 文明の道1：アレクサンドロス 〜世界帝国への夢〜 ('Alexander: Dream of the World Empire')
- 文明の道2：クビライ 〜世界帝国の完成〜 ('Kublai: Completion of the World Empire')

Book series

- 文明の道1：アレクサンドロスの時代 ('Era of Alexander the Great')
- 文明の道2：ヘレニズムと仏教 ('Hellenism and Buddhism')
- 文明の道3：海と陸のシルクロード ('The Silk Road on Land and Sea')
- 文明の道4：イスラムと十字軍 ('Islam and the Crusades')
- 文明の道5：モンゴル帝国 ('Mongol Empire')
