= Baalbek Stones =

Monolithic stones in Baalbek, Lebanon

Coordinates: 33°59′57″N 36°12′01″E

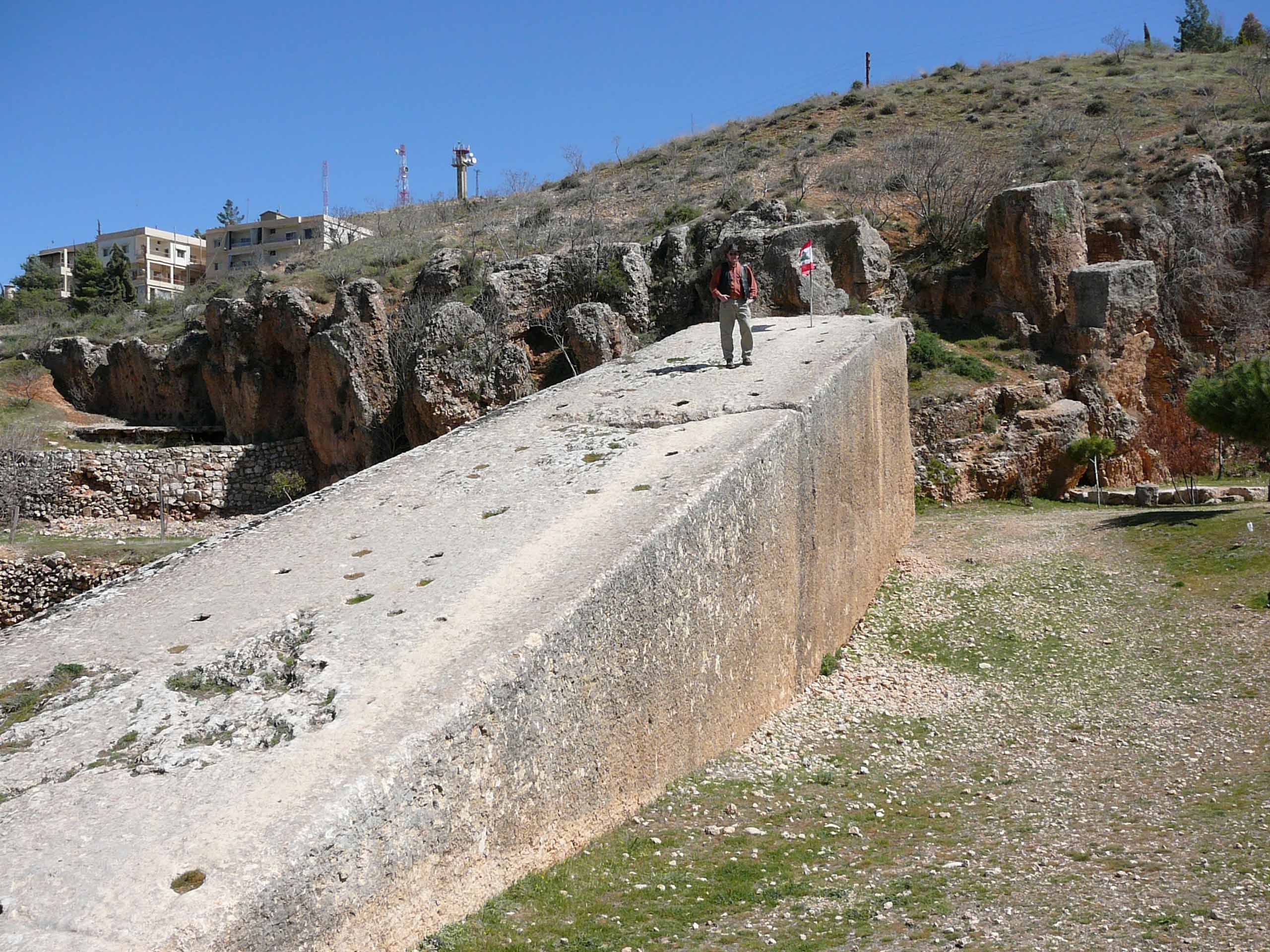
The Stone of the Pregnant Woman before its current excavation

The Baalbek Stones are six massive Roman worked stone blocks in Baalbek (ancient Heliopolis), Lebanon, characterized by a megalithic giant unparalleled in antiquity. The stones were quarried from nearby hillsides. Several of the large monoliths were only partially hewn from the hillsides.

The smaller three are part of a podium wall in the Roman complex of the Temple of Jupiter Baal (Heliopolitan Zeus) known as the "Trilithon". Each of these is estimated at 750 tons. The quarry was slightly higher than the temple complex, so no lifting was required to move the stones. The large stones may have been moved into position on rollers along temporary earthen banks from the quarry.

The remaining three are Roman monoliths, not part of a larger structure, conventionally known as the "Stone of the Pregnant Woman" (estimated at 1,000 t), the "Stone of the South" (est. 1,242 t), and the "Forgotten Stone" (est. 1,650 t). These are the first, third, and tied fifth largest known stones ever quarried in human history. They are believed to have been intended for the nearby Jupiter Baal complex, possibly as an addition to the Trilithon; but, they were never removed from their quarry. They have not been used since their extraction - some only partially extracted - in ancient times.

Numerous archaeological expeditions have gone to the site starting in the 19th century, primarily German and French groups, and research has continued into the 21st century.

== Trilithon ==
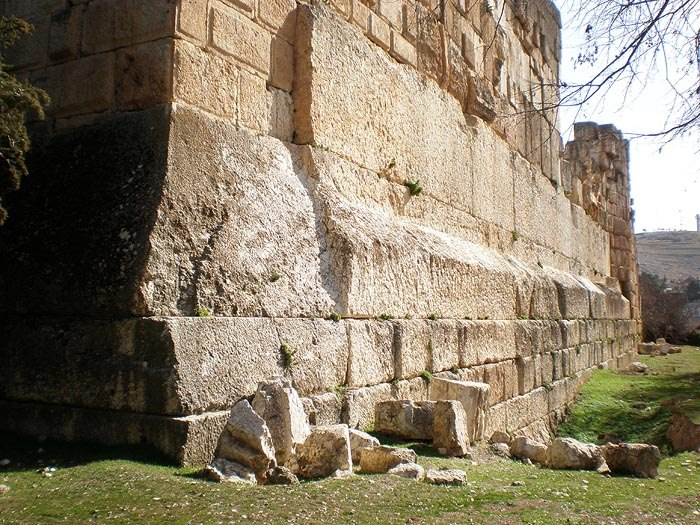
The blocks known as the Trilithon (the upper of the two largest courses of stone pictured) in the Temple of Jupiter Baal

The Trilithon (Greek: Τρίλιθον), also called the Three Stones, is a group of three horizontally lying giant stones that form part of the podium of the Temple of Jupiter Baal at Baalbek. The location of the megalithic structures is atop a hill in the region known as Tel Baalbek. Each one of these stones is 19 metres (62 ft) long, 4.2 metres (14 ft) high, and 3.6 metres (12 ft) thick, and weighs around 750 tons. The supporting stone layer beneath features a number of stones which weigh an estimated 350 tonnes (770,000 lb) and are 11 metres (36 ft) wide.

Although they do not form a trilithon in the modern archaeological sense, they have been known as the Trilithon since at latest the early Byzantine period.

== Stone of the Pregnant Woman ==
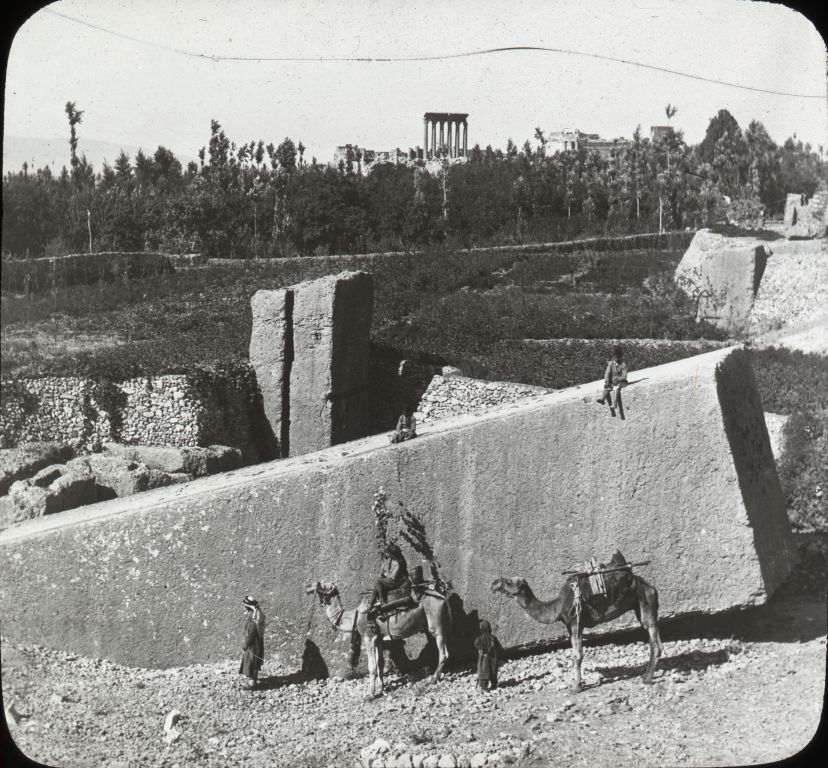
Stone of the Pregnant Woman on an early 20th-century lantern slide

The Stone of the Pregnant Woman (Arabic: حجر الحبلي, romanized: Ḥajar el-Ḥible), also called the First Monolith, still lies in the ancient quarry at a distance of 900 metres (3,000 ft) from the Heliopolis temple complex. Although the smallest of the three monoliths, it is also the most famous due to its fine condition, the imposing angle at which it lies, and it never having been fully hidden by the earth.

The block was never fully excavated, with the bottom still connected to the bedrock beneath it. A study in 2015 discovered cracks and a defect visible on the northwestern - and most downhill and thus perhaps last to be excavated - face of the monolith.

In 1996, a geodetic team of the Austrian city of Linz conducted topographical measurements at the site, which aimed at establishing the exact dimensions of the two monoliths and their possible use in the construction of the gigantic Jupiter temple. According to their calculations, the block weighs c. 1,000 tonnes (2,200,000 lb), thus practically confirming older estimations such as that of Jean-Pierre Adam.

The rectangular stone block is:

- 20.31–20.76 metres (66.6–68.1 ft) long
- 4 metres (13 ft) wide at the base
- 4.14–5.29 metres (13.6–17.4 ft) wide at the top
- 4.21–4.32 metres (13.8–14.2 ft) high
- Has an estimated density of 2.6–2.8 g/cm^{3} (0.094–0.101 lb/cu in)

There are multiple stories behind the name. One says the monolith is named after a pregnant woman who tricked the people of Baalbek into believing that she knew how to move the giant stone if only they would feed her until she gave birth. Others say the name comes from the legends that pregnant jinn were assigned the task of cutting and moving the stone, while others say that the name reflects the belief that a woman who touches the stone experiences an increase in fertility.

== Stone of the South ==
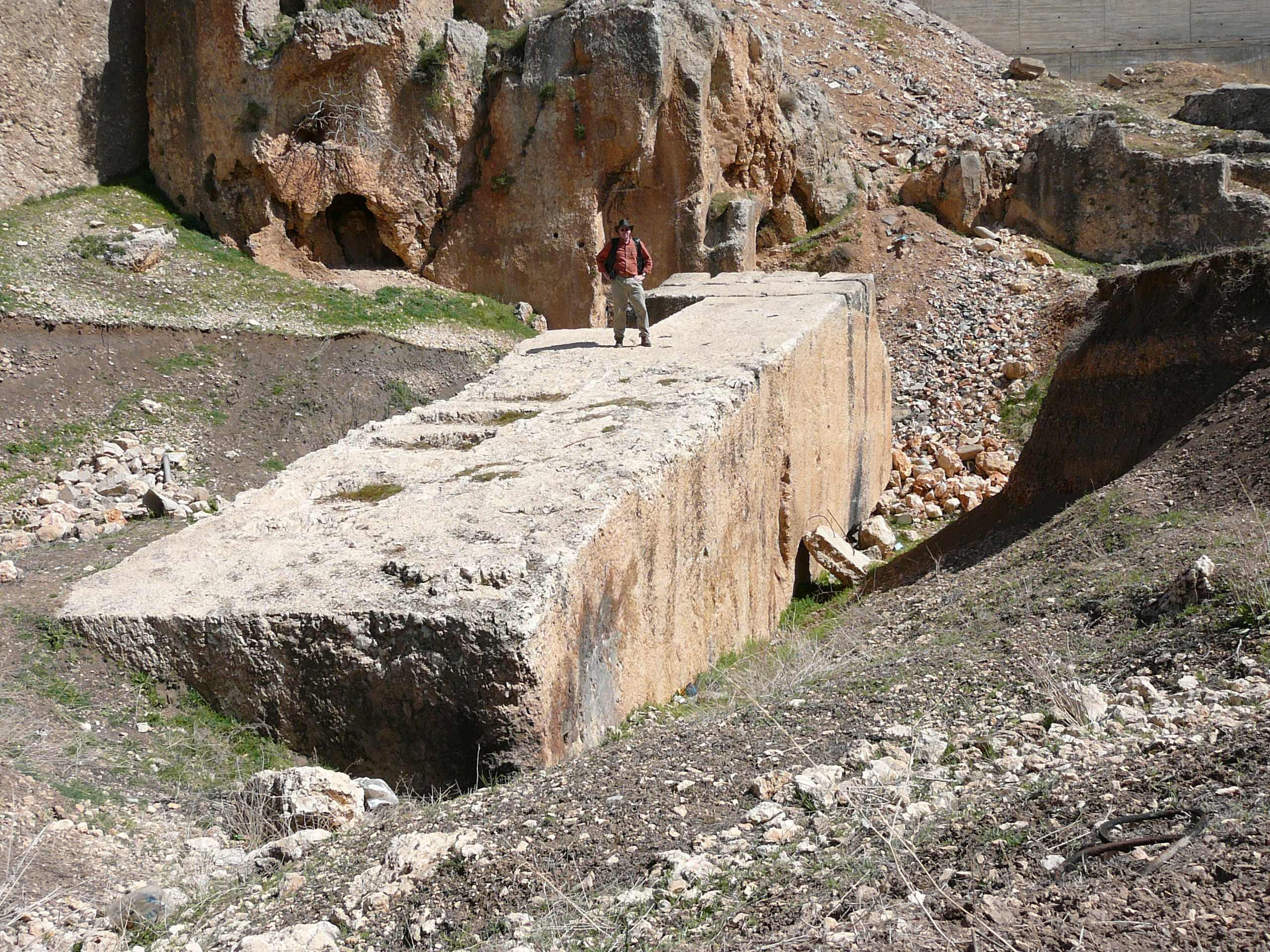
The Stone of the South, discovered at Baalbek in the 1990s and weighing 1,242 t

The Stone of the South (Arabic: حجر القبلي, romanized: Ḥajar el-Guble), also called the Second Monolith, was rediscovered in the same quarry in the 1990s. With its weight estimated at 1,242 tonnes (2,738,000 lb), it surpasses even the dimension of the Stone of the Pregnant Woman. (There is some confusion over the naming, due to its location having been forgotten, and accordingly some sources identify "Stone of the South" as an alternate name of the Stone of the Pregnant Woman.)

These are dimensions of the rectangular stone block, assuming that its shape is consistent in its still-buried parts:

- 19.5–20.5 metres (64–67 ft) long
- 4.34–4.56 metres (14.2–15.0 ft) wide
- 4.5 metres (15 ft) high
- Has an estimated density of 2.6–2.8 g/cm^{3} (0.094–0.101 lb/cu in)

== Forgotten Stone ==
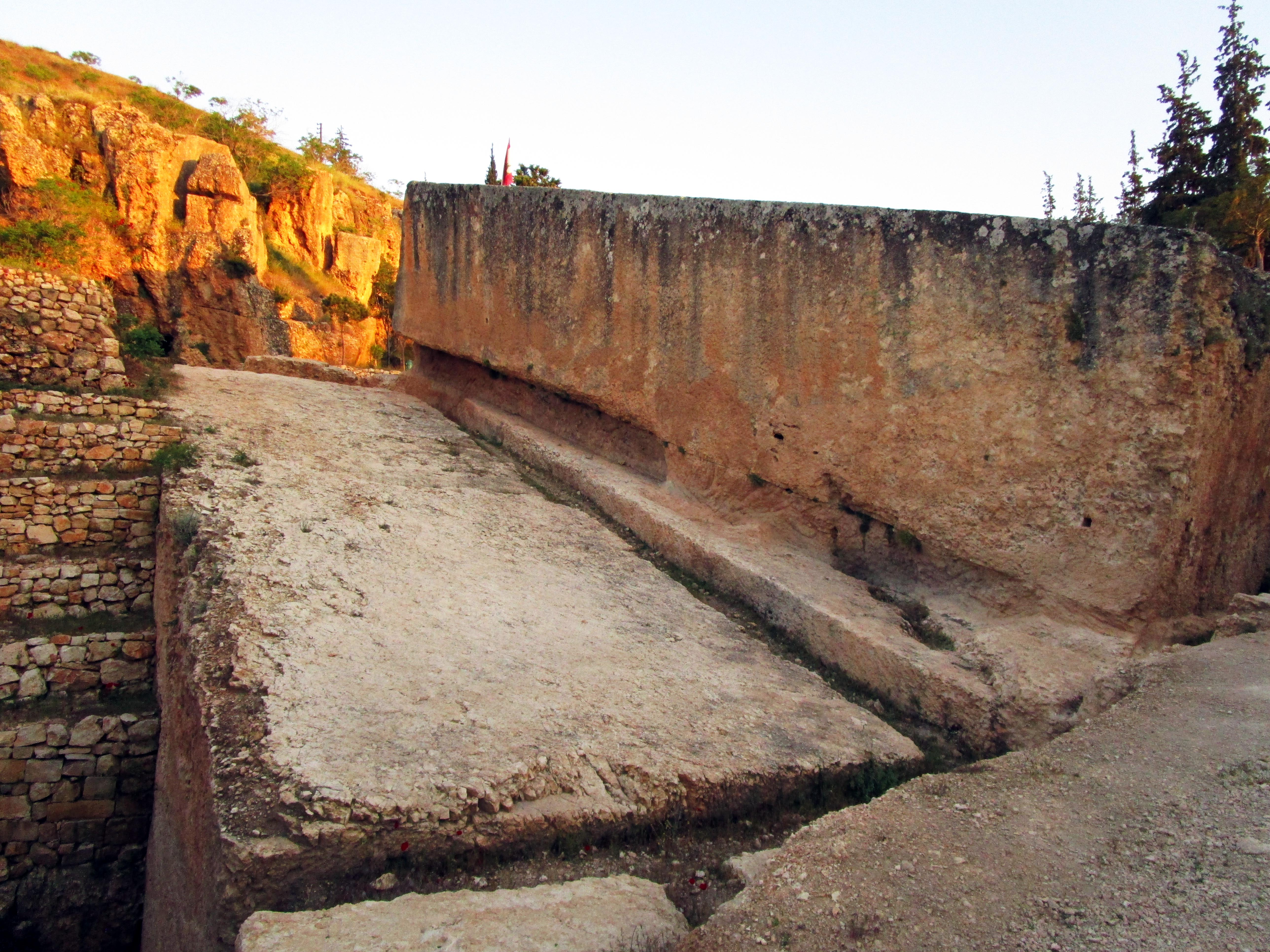
The Third Monolith in situ at Baalbek quarry, on the left beside the Stone of the Pregnant Woman

The Forgotten Stone, also called the Third Monolith, was discovered in the same quarry in 2014 by archaeologists from the German Archaeological Institute. Its weight is estimated at around 1,500 tonnes (3,300,000 lb).

It is 19.6 metres (64 ft) long, 6 metres (20 ft) wide, and at least 5.5 metres (18 ft) high.

== See also ==
- List of largest monoliths
- Western Stone
- List of ancient architectural records
