= Lovebox (film) =

2026 German documentary film

- Directed by: Daniela Michel; Alexander Kleider
- Cinematography: Steph Ketelhut; Alexander Kleider
- Edited by: Daniela Michel; Alexander Kleider
- Music by: Eckes Malz
- Distributed by: Neue Visionen
- Release date: 24 September 2026
- Running time: 96 minutes
- Country: Germany

Lovebox is a 2026 German documentary film directed by Alexander Kleider and Daniela Michel. The film was released in Germany on 24 September 2026 by Neue Visionen.

== Synopsis ==
At the AfrikaBurn festival in the South African desert, an international group of friends uses the "Lovebox", a converted trailer where two strangers sit opposite each other without outside distractions. For seven minutes, participants maintain eye contact and answer questions about love and life, eventually sharing personal stories and life-changing experiences.

The film also introduces some of the 13 people behind the experiment, including Eric van Lente, who provides the voiceover narration.

== Production ==
Lovebox was produced by DOK-WERK filmkooperative. It was directed by Daniela Michel and Alexander Kleider, with cinematography by Steph Ketelhut and music by Eckes Malz.

== Release ==
Lovebox was released theatrically in Germany on 24 September 2026 by Neue Visionen.

== Reception ==
Josef Grübl of the Süddeutsche Zeitung wrote that the film was "very artistic" and described Lovebox as a social experiment about openness and closeness.

Björn Schneider of Programmkino.de noted that the filmmakers did not judge or interfere in the experiment and called the documentary a plea for more openness and understanding between people.
