= Aquarela =

2018 documentary film

- Film poster
- Directed by: Viktor Kossakovsky
- Written by: Viktor Kossakovsky; Aimara Reques
- Produced by: Heino Deckert; Sigrid Dyekjær; Aimara Reques
- Cinematography: Ben Bernhard; Viktor Kossakovsky
- Edited by: Viktor Kossakovsky; Molly Malene Steensgaard; Ainara Vera
- Music by: Eicca Toppinen
- Distributed by: Park Circus (United Kingdom); Neue Visionen Filmverleih (Germany); Sony Pictures Classics (United States and Denmark)
- Release date: September 1, 2018 (Venice International Film Festival)
- Running time: 90 minutes
- Countries: United Kingdom; Germany; Denmark; United States
- Languages: Russian; English; Spanish
- Box office: $671,631

Aquarela is a 2018 documentary film co-written, shot, edited, and directed by Viktor Kossakovsky. It shows water and ice in different parts of the world and features minimal dialogue. It premiered at the 75th Venice International Film Festival in September 2018.

== Reception ==
On the review aggregator website Rotten Tomatoes, 87% of 62 critics' reviews are positive, with an average rating of 6.8/10. The website's consensus reads: "Patiently constructed and beautifully filmed, Aquarela views man's relationship with water through a sobering -- and awe-inducing -- lens." Metacritic, which uses a weighted average, assigned the film a score of 80 out of 100, based on 20 critics, indicating "generally favorable" reviews.

Glenn Kenny of RogerEbert.com gave the film three out of four stars and wrote, "This is a purely sensationalistic cinematic experience that paradoxically encourages reflection and contemplation. Although the use of some (admittedly pretty good) heavy metal music on the soundtrack feels like a bit of overreaching."
