= Viktor Kossakovsky =

Russian documentary filmmaker (born 1961)

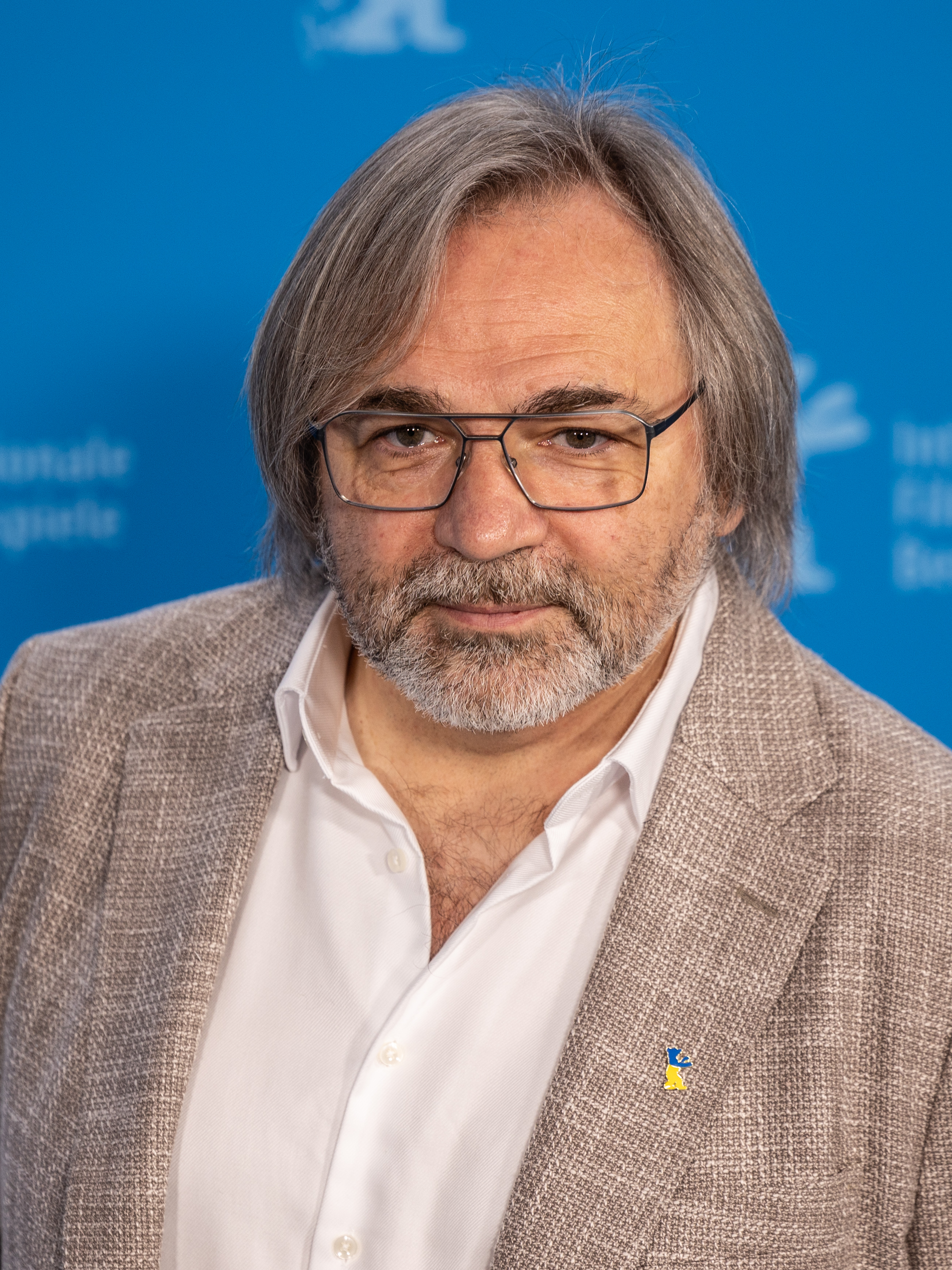
- Kossakovsky in 2024
- Born: Viktory Kossakovsky; 19 July 1961 (age 65); Leningrad, Russian SFSR, Soviet Union (present day Saint Petersburg, Russia)
- Occupation: Documentarian
- Years active: 1978 – present

Viktor Kossakovsky (Russian: Виктор Косаковский; born 19 July 1961) is a Russian documentary filmmaker.

== Early life ==
Kossakovsky was born in Saint Petersburg, Russia, at the time Leningrad, U.S.S.R. He began his film career in 1978, working as an assistant cameraman, assistant director, and editor at the Leningrad Studio of Documentaries. From 1986 to 1988, he studied screenwriting and directing at Moscow HCSF. He became a vegetarian during his childhood.

== Career ==
Kossakovsky's first released feature was his 1992 documentary Belovy / The Belovs. Subsequent works include his 2002 documentary Hush! / Tishe! and his 2003 documentary Russia from My Window (2003), both made from footage that Kossakovsky filmed out his bedroom window or on his street in St. Petersburg; and his well-received meditation on the natural wonder of water, Aquarela (2018), released in the U.S. by Sony Pictures Classics. In 2011, his documentary ¡Vivan las Antipodas! was selected as the opening film of the Venice Film Festival.

== Awards ==
In 1993, his first feature, Belovy / The Belovs, won both the VPRO Joris Ivens Award and the Audience Award.

Other awards include the Special Jury Award at the International Documentary Film Festival Amsterdam for Pavel i Lyalya in 1999, the Documentary Award at the Edinburgh International Film Festival for Sreda (Wednesday), the Award of Honor at Karlovy Vary International Film Festival for Sreda, the Dok Leipzig Findling Award for Pavel i Lyala, the True Vision Award at the 2012 True/False Film Festival and the Genziana d'Oro – Gran Premio Città di Trento at the 60th Trento Film Festival (2012). His film Gunda was shortlisted for the Academy Award for Best Documentary at the 93rd Oscars.

== Filmography ==
=== Documentaries ===
Year	English title	Original title
1994	The Belovs	Беловы
1998	Pavel i Lyala	Павел и Ляля
1999	Wednesday 07.19.61	Среда 19.07.61
2002	Hush!	Тише!
2003	I Loved You	Я любил тебя
2003	Russia from my Window	Россия из моего окна
2011	Long Live the Antipodes!	¡Vivan las Antipodas!
2013	Demonstration	
2018	Aquarela	
2020	Gunda	
2024	Architecton	
2026	Holy Wood Dust	

=== Short documentaries ===
- Svyato (2005)
- DisplAir (2012)
