= Point du Jour International =

Magazine producer and publisher

- Industry: Mass media
- Headquarters: Paris, France
- Area served: France
- Key people: Luc Martin-Gousset
- Website: www.pointdujour-international.com

Point du Jour International is a French documentary, magazine producer, record label and publisher, with a headquarters in Paris, France.

== Notable documentaries ==
- Eurasia (joint production with NHK)
