= Temple of Jupiter (Baalbek) =

Ruined Roman temple in Baalbek

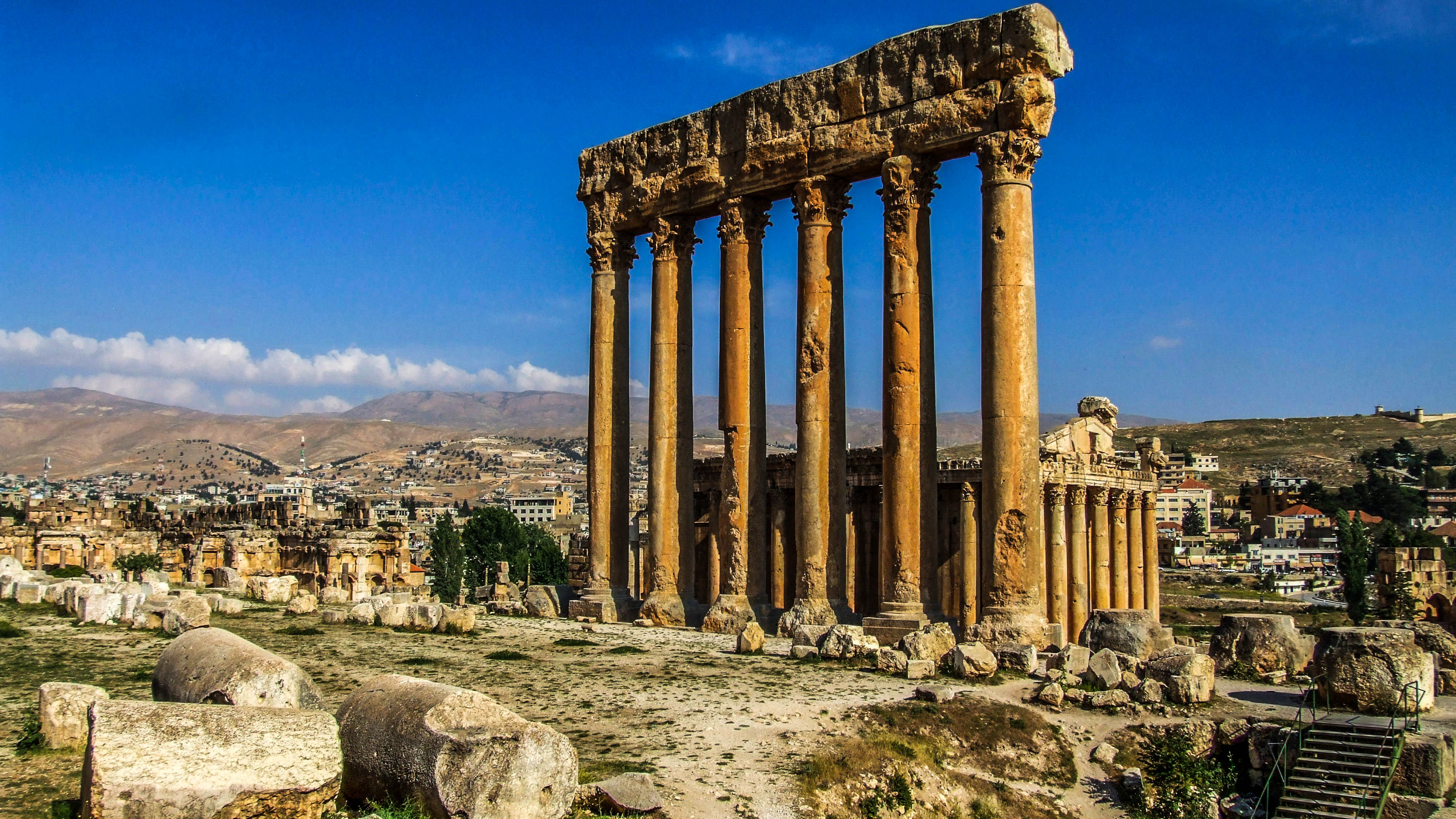

General information
- Type: Roman temple
- Architectural style: Classical
- Location: Baalbek, Lebanon; Heliopolis, Roman Phoenicia
- Coordinates: 34°0′24″N 36°12′12″E
- Completed: late 1st

Height
- Height: 31 m (102 ft)

Technical details
- Size: 66 by 35 m (217 by 115 ft)

The Temple of Jupiter is a colossal Roman temple in Baalbek, Lebanon. It is the largest of the Roman world after the Temple of Venus and Roma in Rome. It is unknown who commissioned or designed the temple, nor exactly when it was constructed. Its construction most likely began in the first century BC. It is situated at the western end of the Great Court of Roman Heliopolis, on a broad platform of stone raised another 7 m (23 ft) above the huge stones of the foundation, three of which are among the heaviest blocks ever used in a construction. Cultic activity had long taken place at the site; the temple presumably replaced an earlier one, possibly using the same foundation. (Note: Daniel Lohmann wrote that, "due to the lack of remains of temple architecture, it can be assumed that the temple this terrace was built for was never completed or entirely destroyed before any new construction started..." "The unfinished pre-Roman sanctuary construction was incorporated into a master plan of monumentalisation. Apparently challenged by the already huge pre-Roman construction, the early imperial Jupiter sanctuary shows both an architectural "imperial" design and construction technique in the first half of the first century AD.")

It was the biggest temple dedicated to Jupiter Optimus Maximus Heliopolitanus in all the Roman Empire. The columns were 19.9 meters (65.3 ft) high with a diameter of nearly 2.5 meters (8.2 ft): the biggest in the classical world. It took three centuries to create this colossal temple complex.

== History ==
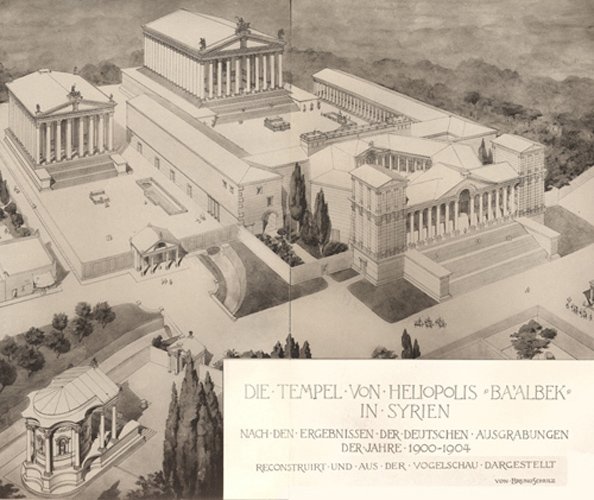
The layout of ancient Baalbek including the temple

The huge quarry nearby likely played into the Roman decision to create a huge "Great Court" of a big pagan temple complex in this mountain site, despite being located at 1,145 meters (3756 ft) of altitude and lying on the remote eastern border of the Roman Empire.

Although the 6th-century Greek historian John Malalas dates the temple to the reign of Antoninus Pius (AD 138–161), construction probably started soon after around 16 BC, when Baalbek became a Roman colony known as Colonia Julia Augusta Felix Heliopolitana. It was largely completed by AD 60 as evidenced by a graffito located on one of the topmost column drums. It was an important religious site during the Roman Empire, and emperors often consulted the temple's oracle. Trajan learned of his imminent death c. AD 115.

== Architecture ==
The temple complex is on a raised plaza erected 7 m (23 ft) over an earlier T-shaped base consisting of a podium, staircase, and foundation walls. (Note: "Current survey and interpretation, show that a pre-Roman floor level about 5 m lower than the late Great Roman Courtyard floor existed underneath".) These walls were built from about 24 monoliths, at their lowest level weighing approximately 300 tonnes each. The tallest retaining wall, on the west, has a second course of monoliths containing the famed "Three Stones" (Ancient Greek: Τρίλιθον, Trílithon): cut from limestone, measuring over 19 m (62 ft) long, 4.3 m (14 ft) high, and 3.6 m (12 ft) broad, they weigh approximately 800 tonnes each. (A fourth, still larger stone called the Stone of the Pregnant Woman lies unused in the nearby quarry 800 m (2,600 ft) from the town and weighs around 1,000 tonnes. A fifth, weighing approximately 1,200 tonnes lies in the same quarry.) Through the foundation there run three enormous passages the size of railway tunnels.

A wide staircase provided access to the elevated platform, which measured 47.7 m × 87.75 m (156.5 ft × 287.9 ft) on top. The Temple of Jupiter proper was circled by a peristyle of 54 unfluted Corinthian columns: ten in front and back and nineteen along each side. The columns were 19.9 meters (65.3 ft) high, the tallest of any classical temple, and the apex of the pediment is estimated to have been 44 meters (144.35 ft) above the floor of the court. With a rectangular footprint of 88 by 44 meters 288.7 x 144.35 ft), it is considerably smaller than earlier Greek temples, such as the Temple of Artemis at Ephesus and the Temple of Apollo at Didyma. Rather, its significance lies in the sophistication of its planning and architectural detail.

A number of Julio-Claudian emperors enriched the temple's sanctuary in turn. In the mid-1st century, Nero built the tower-altar opposite the temple. In the early 2nd century, Trajan added the temple's forecourt, with porticos of pink granite shipped from Aswan at the southern end of Egypt.

The Temple-Sanctuary of Heliopolitan Zeus was ruined by earthquakes, and destroyed and pillaged for stone under Theodosius and again under Justinian: eight columns were taken to Constantinople (Istanbul) for incorporation into the Hagia Sophia. Three columns fell during the late 18th century.

== Construction ==
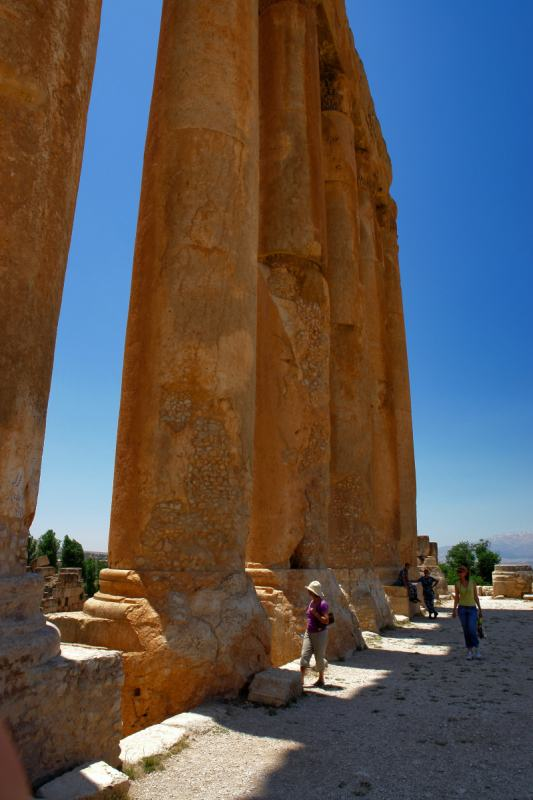
The six monumental columns of the temple.

The original method of construction remains an archeological mystery.

This quarry was slightly higher than the temple complex, so no lifting was required to move the stones.

Individual Roman cranes were not capable of lifting stones in the 60 to 100 tonne range, but a special one could have been built specifically for the construction of this temple.

The large stones may have probably been rolled into position along temporary earthen banks from the quarry or multiple cranes may have been used in combination, or they might have alternated sides a little at a time, filling in supports underneath each time.

Continued archaeological investigations have been hindered by civil unrest in the region.

== Function ==
Macrobius, writing c. 400, says that the temple held a golden statue of Apollo or Zeus. Represented as a beardless youth and in the garb of a charioteer, his right hand held a whip, the left a lightning bolt and ears of wheat.

== Present condition ==
At present, six columns remain standing along its south side with their entablature.

Their capitals remain nearly perfect on the south side, while the Beqaa's winter winds have worn the northern faces almost bare.

The remaining architrave and frieze blocks weigh as much as 60 tonnes (66 tons), with one corner block weighing over 100 tonnes (110 tons), all of them raised to a height of 19 m (62.3 ft) above the ground.

== Gallery ==
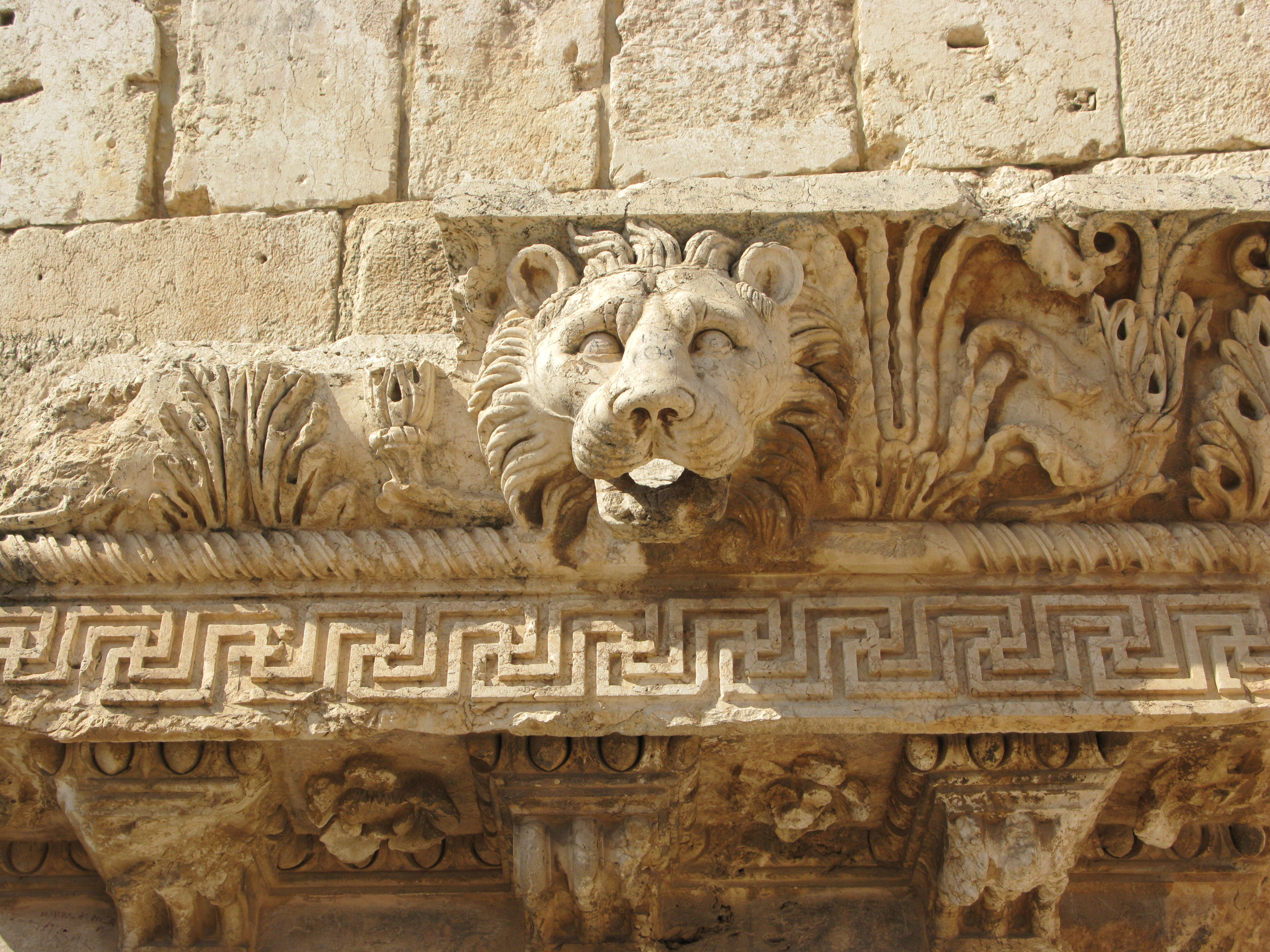
Roman Lion's Head (Gargouille)

The front stoop

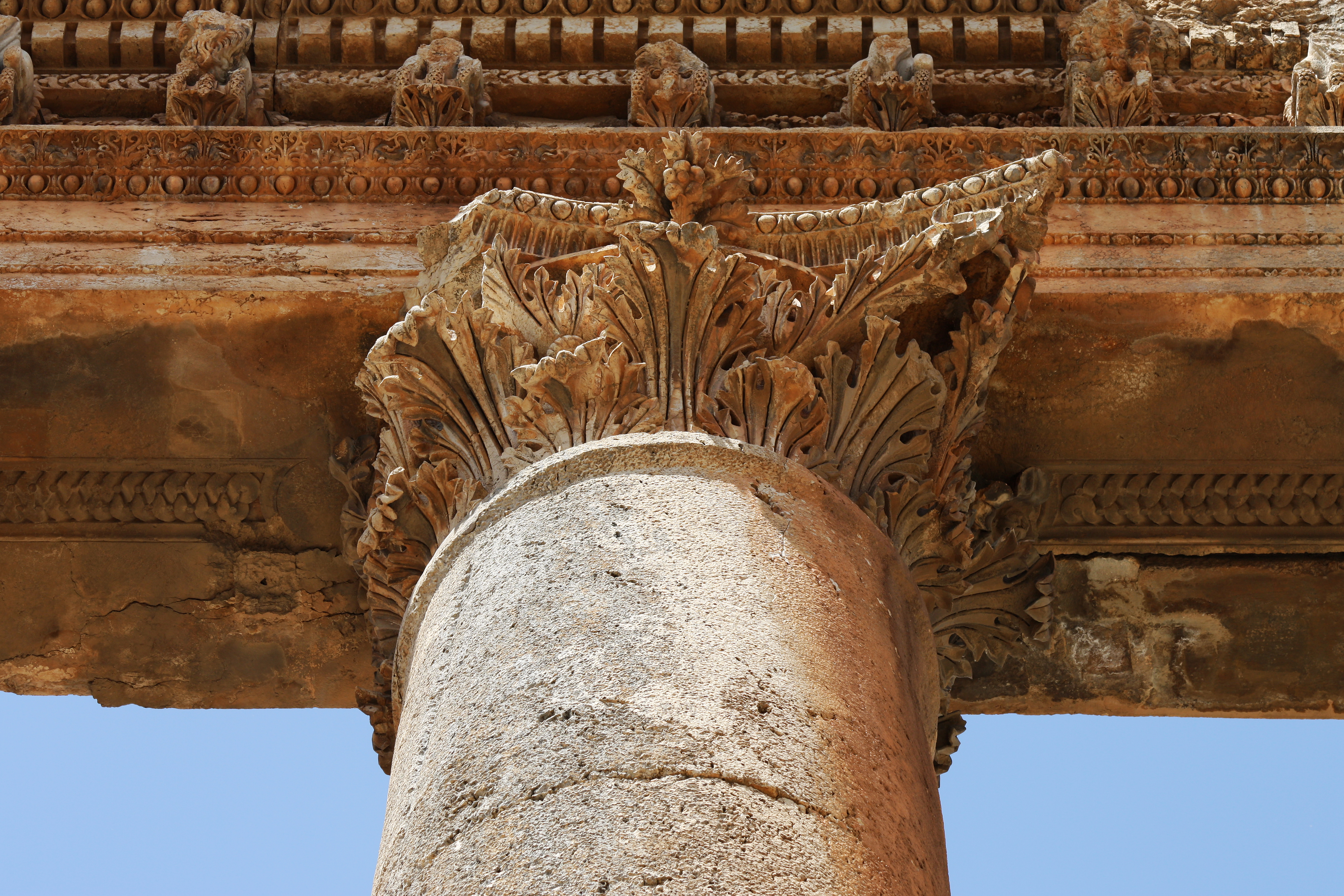
A Corinthian capital

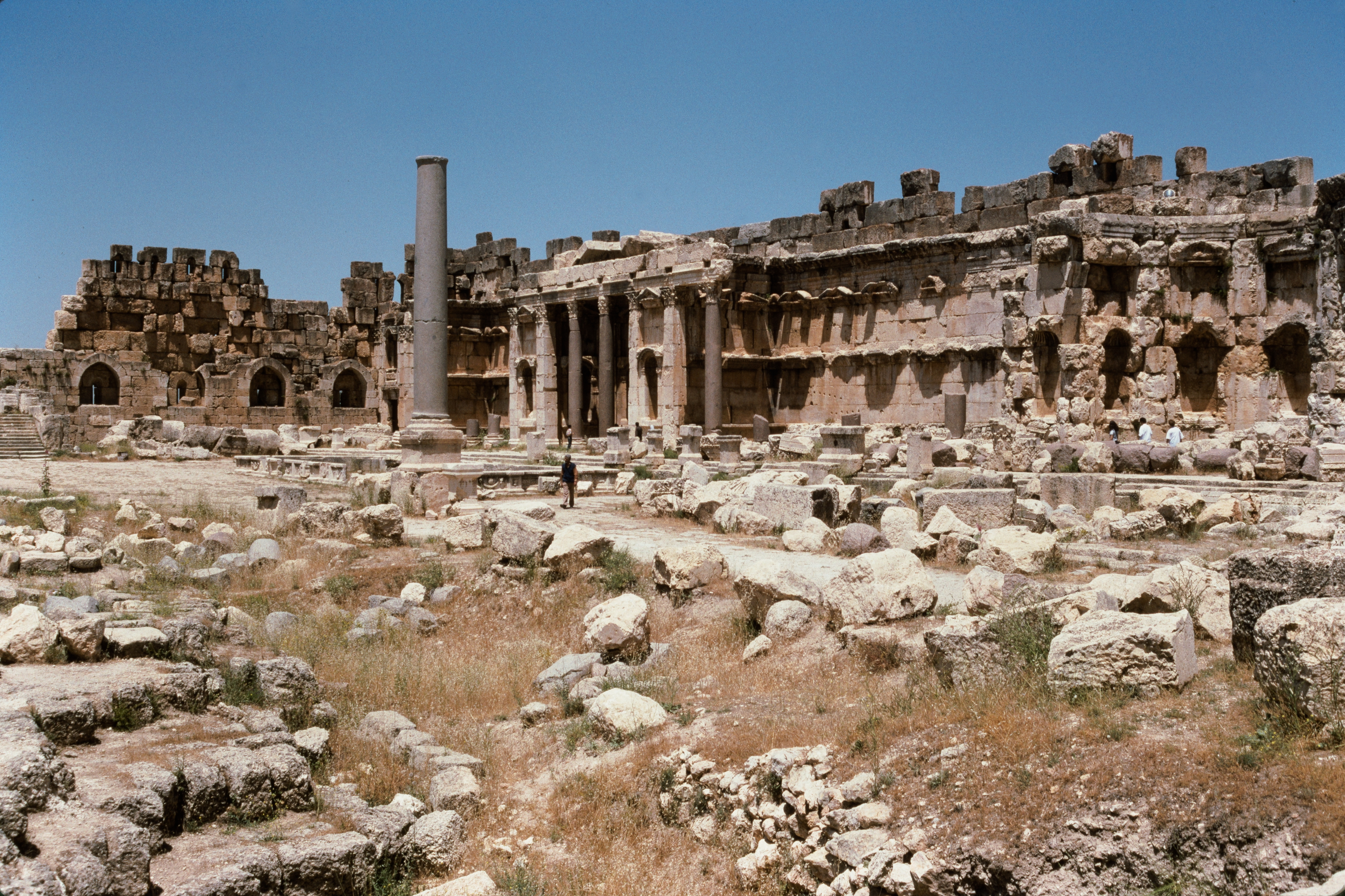
The Great Court, looking northeast

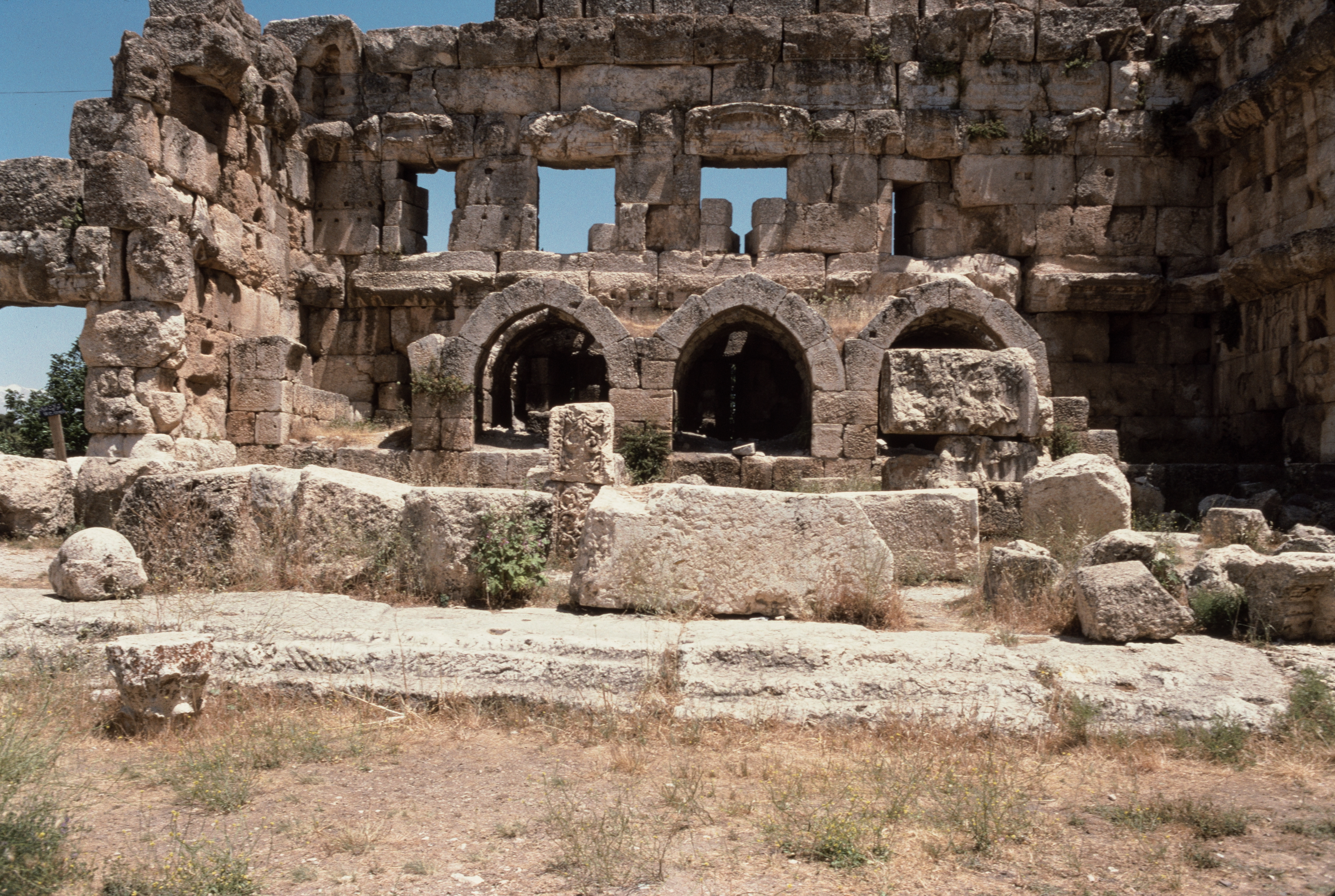
The Hexagonal Court, North pool

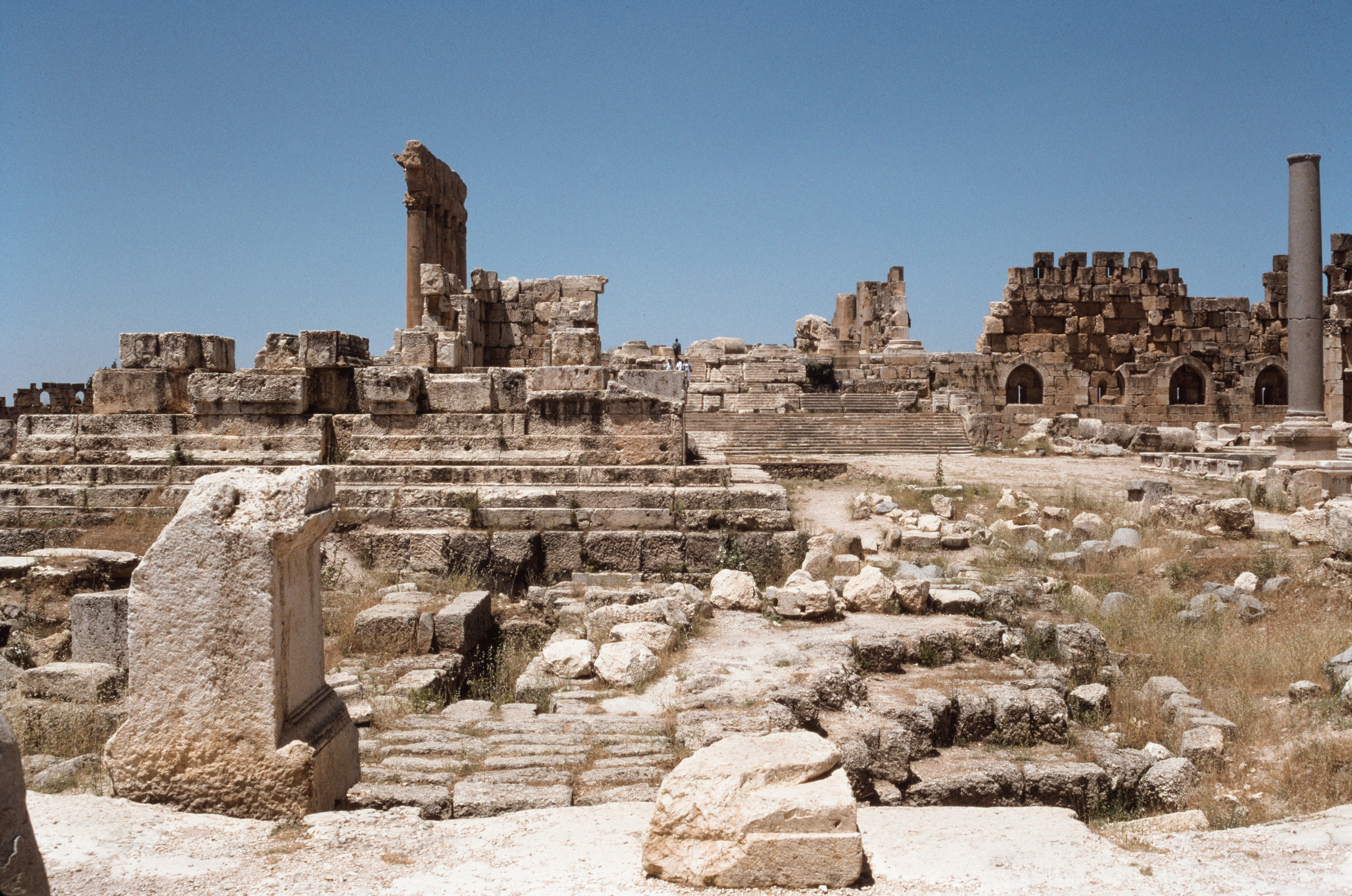
The Great Court, south side

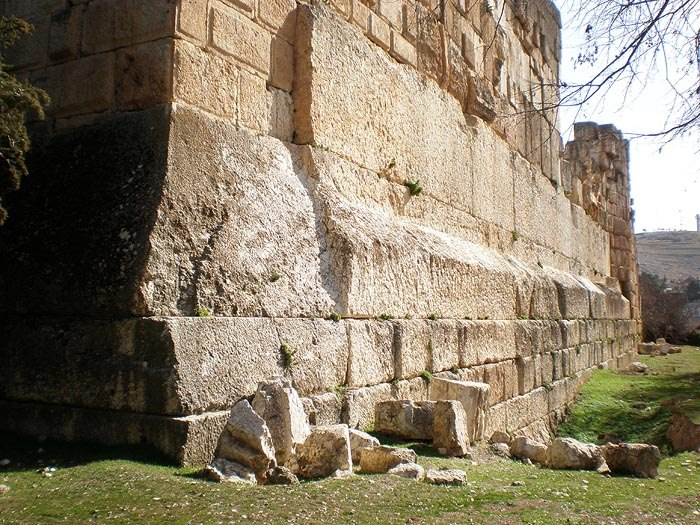
Trilithon

== See also ==
- Roman Phoenicia
- Temple of Bacchus
- 1st century in Lebanon
- 2nd century in Lebanon
- 4th century in Lebanon

== Bibliography ==
- Adam, Jean-Pierre (1977), "À propos du trilithon de Baalbek: Le transport et la mise en oeuvre des mégalithes", Syria (in French), 54 (1/2): 31–63, doi:10.3406/syria.1977.6623
- Adam, Jean-Pierre; Mathews, Anthony (1999). Roman Building: Materials and Techniques. Routledge. ISBN 978-0-415-20866-6.
- Alouf, Michel M. (1944). History of Baalbek. Beirut: American Press. ISBN 9781585090631.
- Cook, Arthur Bernard (1914), Zeus: A Study in Ancient Religion, vol. 1: Zeus God of the Bright Sky, Cambridge: Cambridge University Press
- Coulton, J.J. (1974), "Lifting in Early Greek Architecture", Journal of Hellenic Studies, vol. 94
- Hastings, James (2004) [1898]. A Dictionary of the Bible Dealing with Its Language, Literature, and Contents. Vol. IV, Pt. II. University Press of the Pacific in Honolulu. ISBN 978-1-4102-1729-5.
- Jessup, Samuel (1881), "Ba'albek", Picturesque Palestine, Sinai, and Egypt, Div. II, New York: D. Appleton & Co., illustrated by Henry Fenn & J.D. Woodward, pp. 453–476
- Kropp, Andreas; Lohmann, Daniel (April 2011), "'Master, look at the size of those stones! Look at the size of those buildings!' Analogies in Construction Techniques Between the Temples at Heliopolis (Baalbek) and Jerusalem", Levant, pp. 38–50
- Lohmann, Daniel (2010), "Giant Strides towards Monumentality: The architecture of the Jupiter Sanctuary in Baalbek/Heliopolis", Bolletino di Archaologia [Bulletin of Archaeology], vol. Special Volume, pp. 29–30
- Lyttelton, Margaret (1996). "Baalbek", vol. 3, pp. 1–3, in The Dictionary of Art, 34 volumes, edited by Jane Turner. New York: Grove. ISBN 9781884446009.
- Rowland, Benjamin Jr. (1956), "The Vine-Scroll in Gandhāra", Artibus Asiae, vol. 19, No. 3/4, pp. 353–361
- Ruprechtsberger, Erwin M. (1999), "Vom Steinbruch zum Jupitertempel von Heliopolis/Baalbek (Libanon)" [From the quarry to the Jupiter temple of Heliopolis/Baalbek (Lebanon)], Linzer Archäologische Forschungen (in German), 30: 7–56
