= Temple of Bacchus =

Coordinates: 34.006079°N 36.204038°E

- معبد باخوس
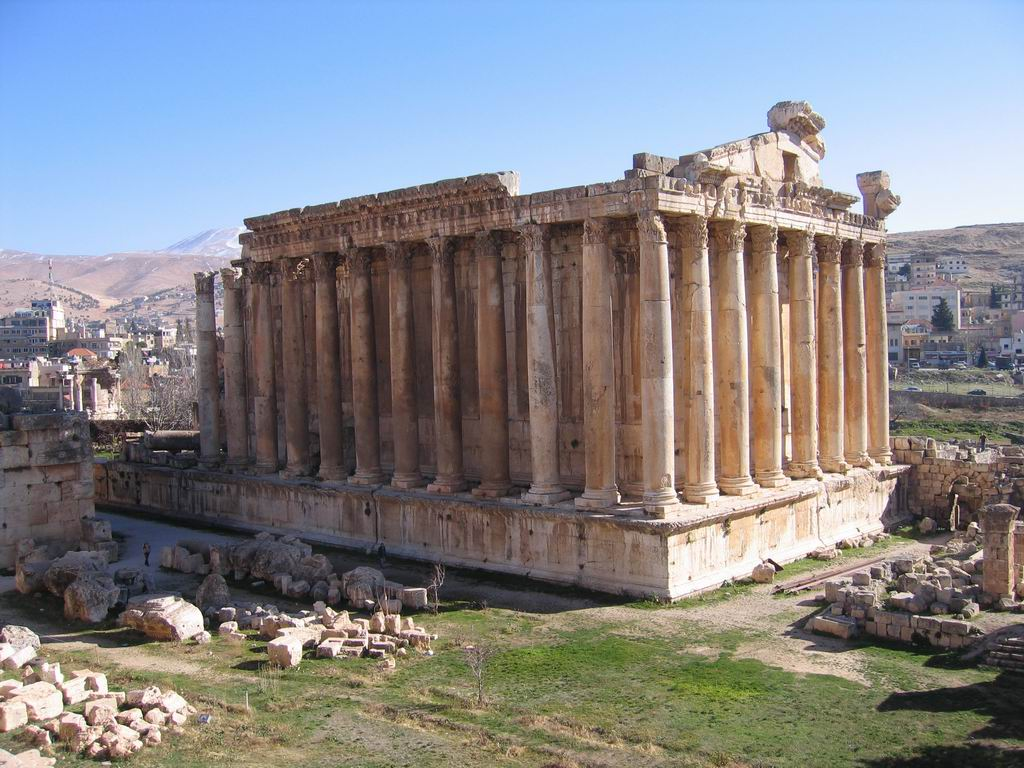
- Corner view of the Temple of Bacchus ruins from the Temple of Jupiter in Baalbek, Lebanon
- Former names: "The Small Temple", Temple of the Sun

General information
- Type: Roman temple
- Architectural style: Classical
- Location: Baalbek, Lebanon; Heliopolis, Roman Phoenicia, Baalbek Archaeological Site, Baalbek, Lebanon
- Current tenants: None (protected archaeological site / tourist attraction)
- Construction started: 138 AD
- Completed: late 2nd or early 3rd century
- Destroyed: 554 (fire)
- Client: Antoninus Pius (commissioned under his reign)
- Owner: Government of Lebanon (administered by the Directorate General of Antiquities)

Height
- Height: 31 m (102 ft)

Dimensions
- Other dimensions: Colonnade of 42 Corinthian columns (19 meters high)

Technical details
- Structural system: Peripteral (stone masonry with ashlar blocks and Corinthian columns)
- Size: 66 by 35 m (217 by 115 ft)
- Floor count: 1 (single-story sanctuary layout)
- Floor area: 2,310 m^{2} (24,900 sq ft)

Design and construction
- Architect: Unknown
- Awards: UNESCO World Heritage Site (as part of Baalbek, inscribed in 1984)

The Temple of Bacchus is part of the Baalbek archaeological site, in Beqaa Valley region of Lebanon. The temple complex is considered an outstanding archaeological and artistic site of Imperial Roman Architecture and was inscribed as a UNESCO World Heritage Site in 1984. It is one of the best preserved and grandest Roman temple ruins; its age is unknown, but its fine ornamentation can be dated to the second century CE.

Its association with Bacchus was first proposed by Otto Puchstein based on its decorative program, but the identification, while widely accepted, is not certain.

== History ==
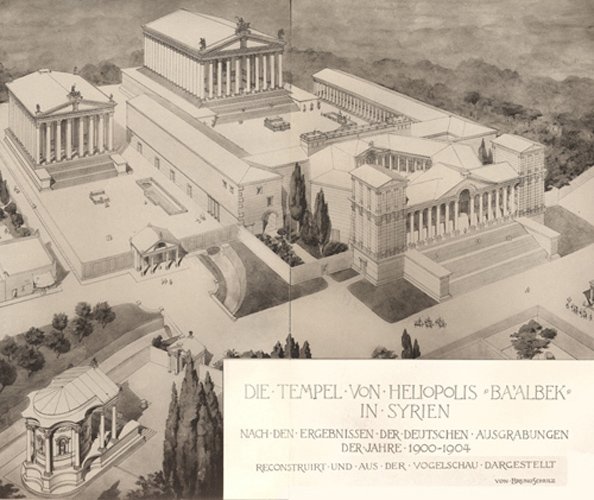
The layout of ancient Baalbek including the temple

The temple was probably commissioned by Roman Emperor Antoninus Pius (r. 138–161). No information was recorded about the site until the 4th century. The temple continued in use until destroyed by fire in 554.

The Temple of Bacchus was possibly protected by the rubble of the rest of the site's ruins. It was not until 1898–1903 that a German expedition excavated two of the large temples and began reconstructions on the site. In 1920, the State of Greater Lebanon was proclaimed and protections and repairs of the site were mandated by the Lebanese government.

In the mid-1970's the Lebanese civil war broke out and protections of the site ceased as Al-Biqā became a stronghold for Palestinian and Syrian forces. In 1984 the ruins at Baalbek were inscribed as a UNESCO World Heritage Site. Preservation of the site began in the 1990s following the end of the war.

The German Archaeological Institute's Orient Department has done a number of archaeological excavations and research on The Temple of Bacchus and the entire temple complex.

== Architecture ==
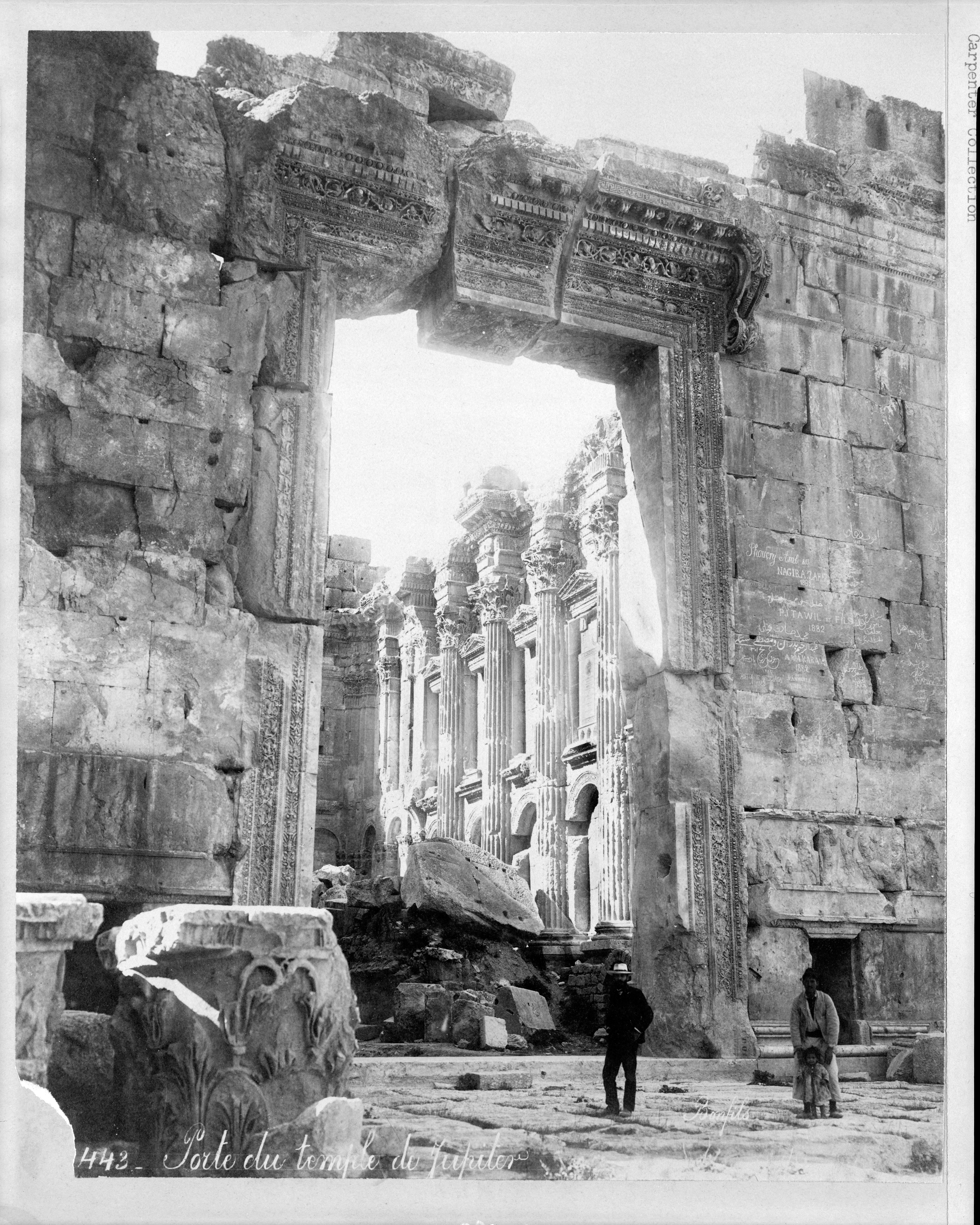
The entrance to the Temple of Bacchus in the 1870s

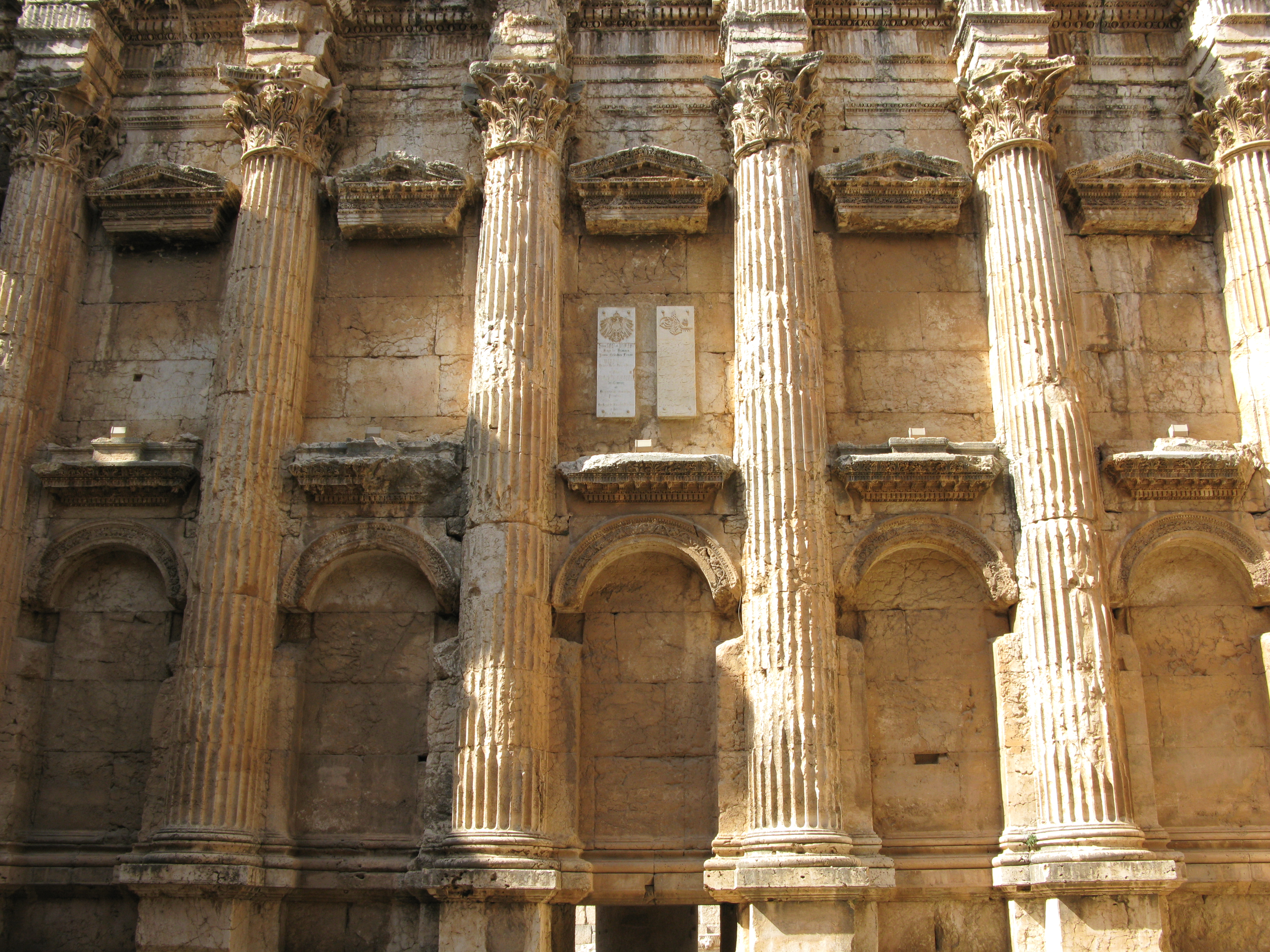
Corinthian capitals ornamenting the columns of the Temple of Bacchus in Baalbek

The temple is 66 m long, 35 m wide and 31 m high, making it only slightly smaller than the Temple of Jupiter. The podium on which the temple sits is on an East-West axis. The peripheral wall is adorned by a colonnade of forty-two unfluted Corinthian columns with Ionic bases, nineteen of which remain upright, and one leaned on the wall. There are eight columns along each end and fifteen along each side — nearly 20 m (66 ft) in height. These were probably erected in a rough state and then rounded, polished, and decorated in position. The columns support a richly carved entablature, which includes an architrave with a three-banded frieze that is decorated with alternating bulls and lions flanking festoons, and cornice ornamented with geometric and floral patterns.

Inside, the cella is decorated with engaged Corinthian columns flanking two levels of niches on each side; a 1757 book about Baalbek speculated these columns were used to support barrel beams, which in turn supported a huge barrel celling. The parapets are decorated with dancing Maenads, supporting the attribution of the temple to Bacchus. The interior of the temple is divided into a 98 ft (30 m) nave and a 36 ft (11 m) adytum or sanctuary on a platform raised 5 ft (2 m) above it and fronted by 13 steps.

The entrance was preserved as late as the 16th century, but the keystone of the lintel had slid 2 ft (1 m) following the 1759 earthquakes; a column of rough masonry was erected in the 1860s or '70s to support it. The earthquakes also damaged the area around the soffit's famed inscription of an eagle, which was entirely covered by the keystone's supporting column. Some historic Roman coins depict the structure of this temple along with Temple of Jupiter.

The Temple is enriched by some of the most refined reliefs and sculpture to survive from antiquity. There are four sculptures carved within the peristyle that are believed to be depictions of Acarina which would make them the first recognizable representations of mites in architecture.

== See also ==
- List of Ancient Roman temples

== Gallery ==
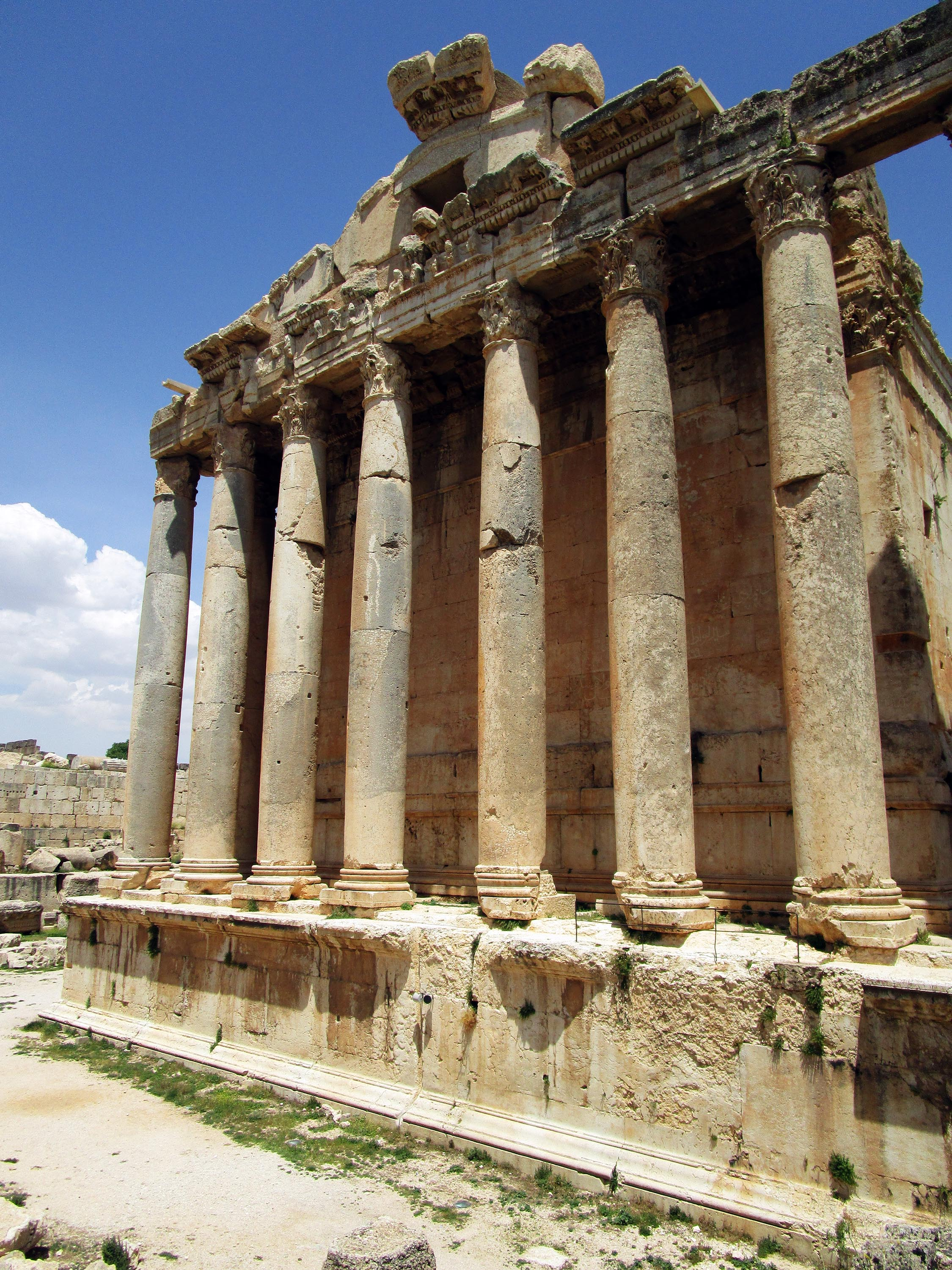

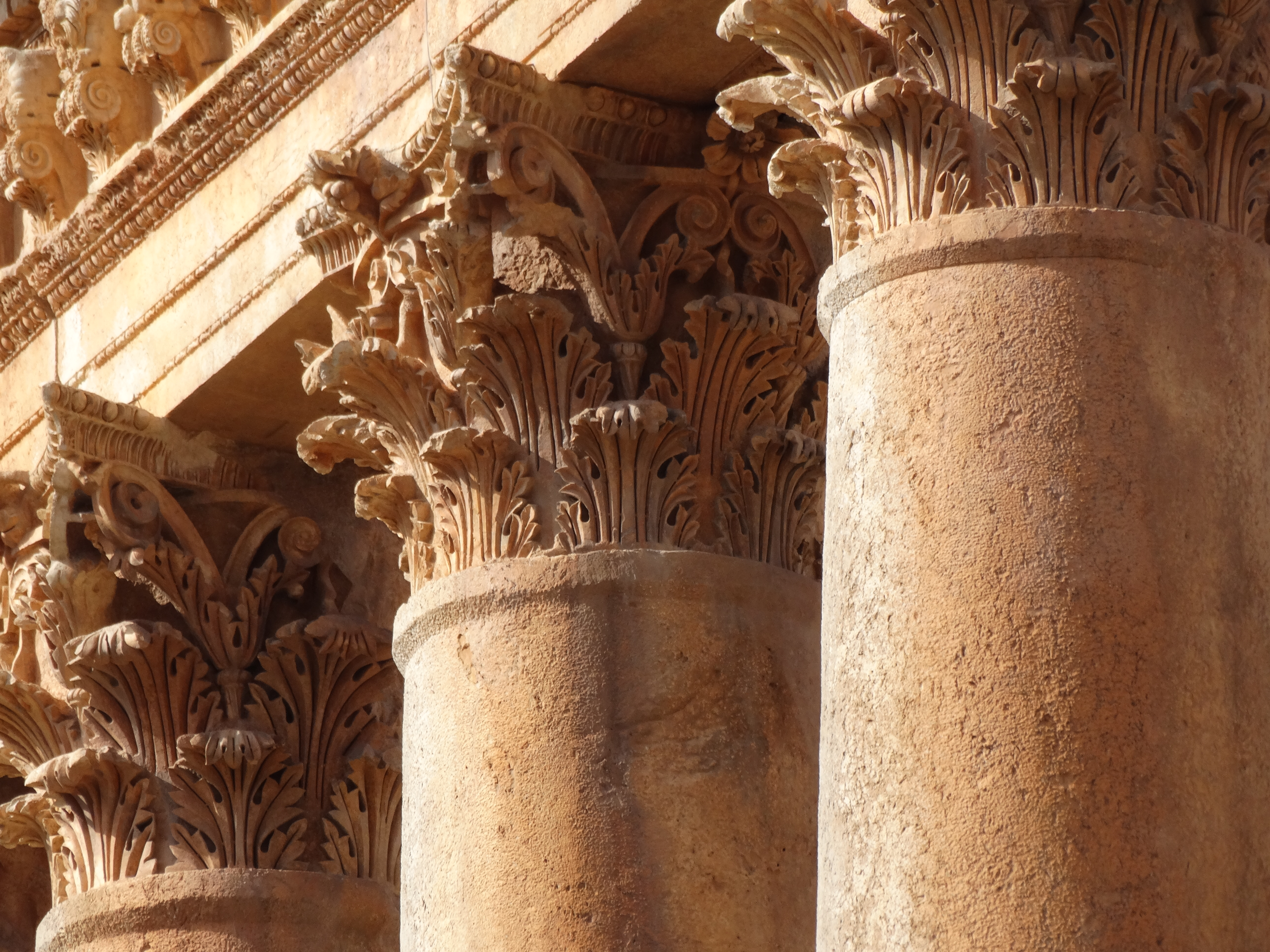

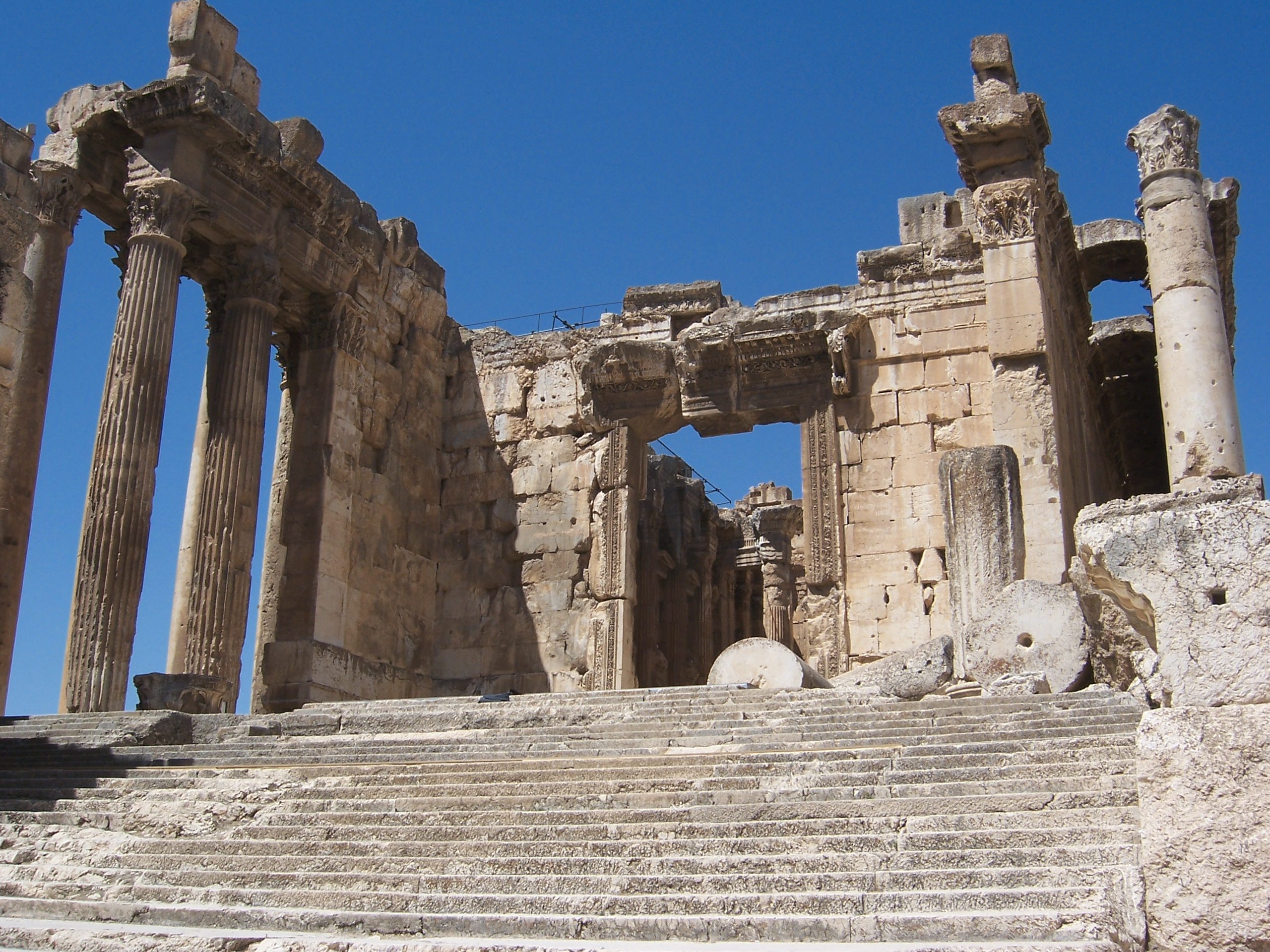

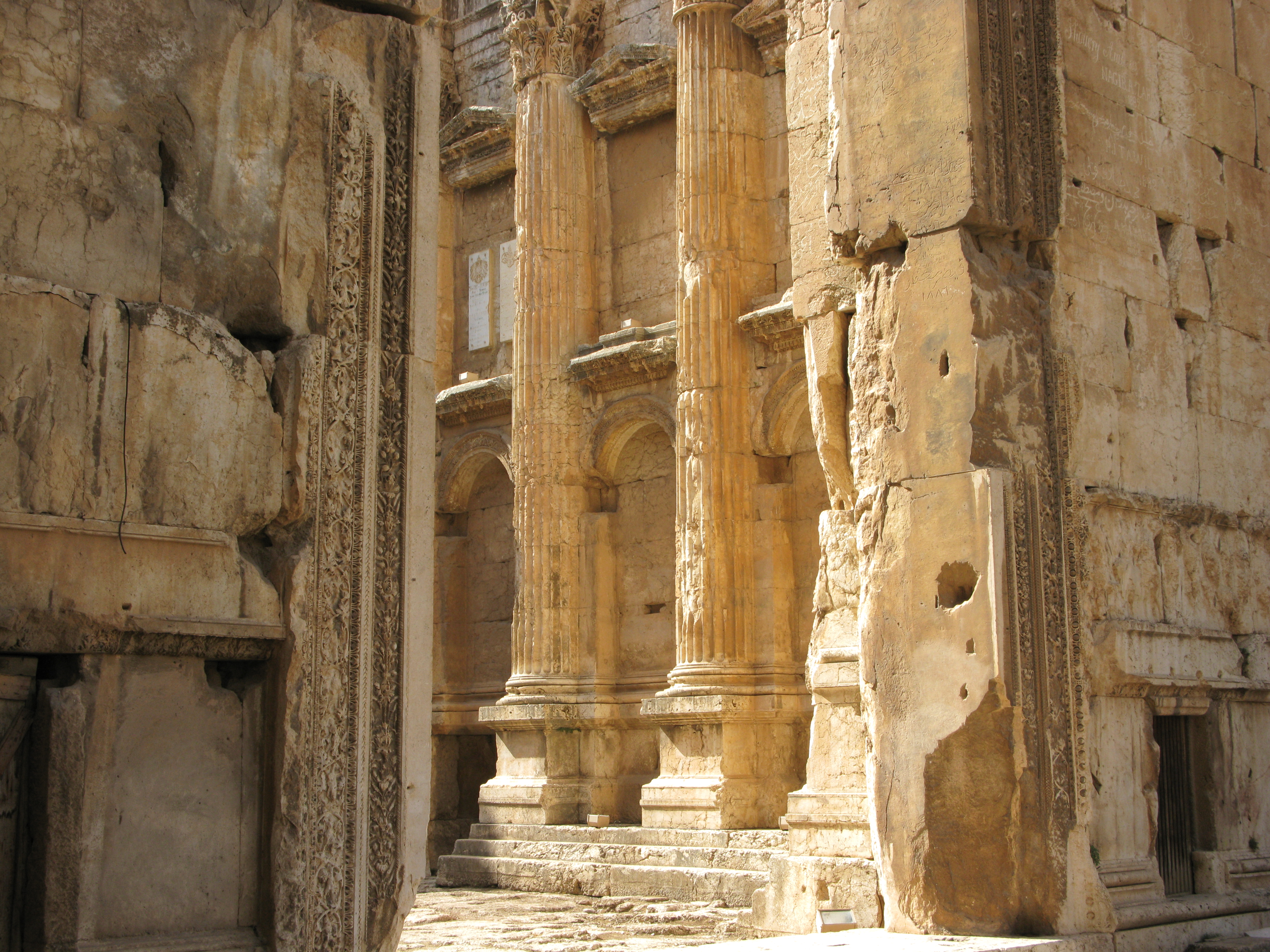

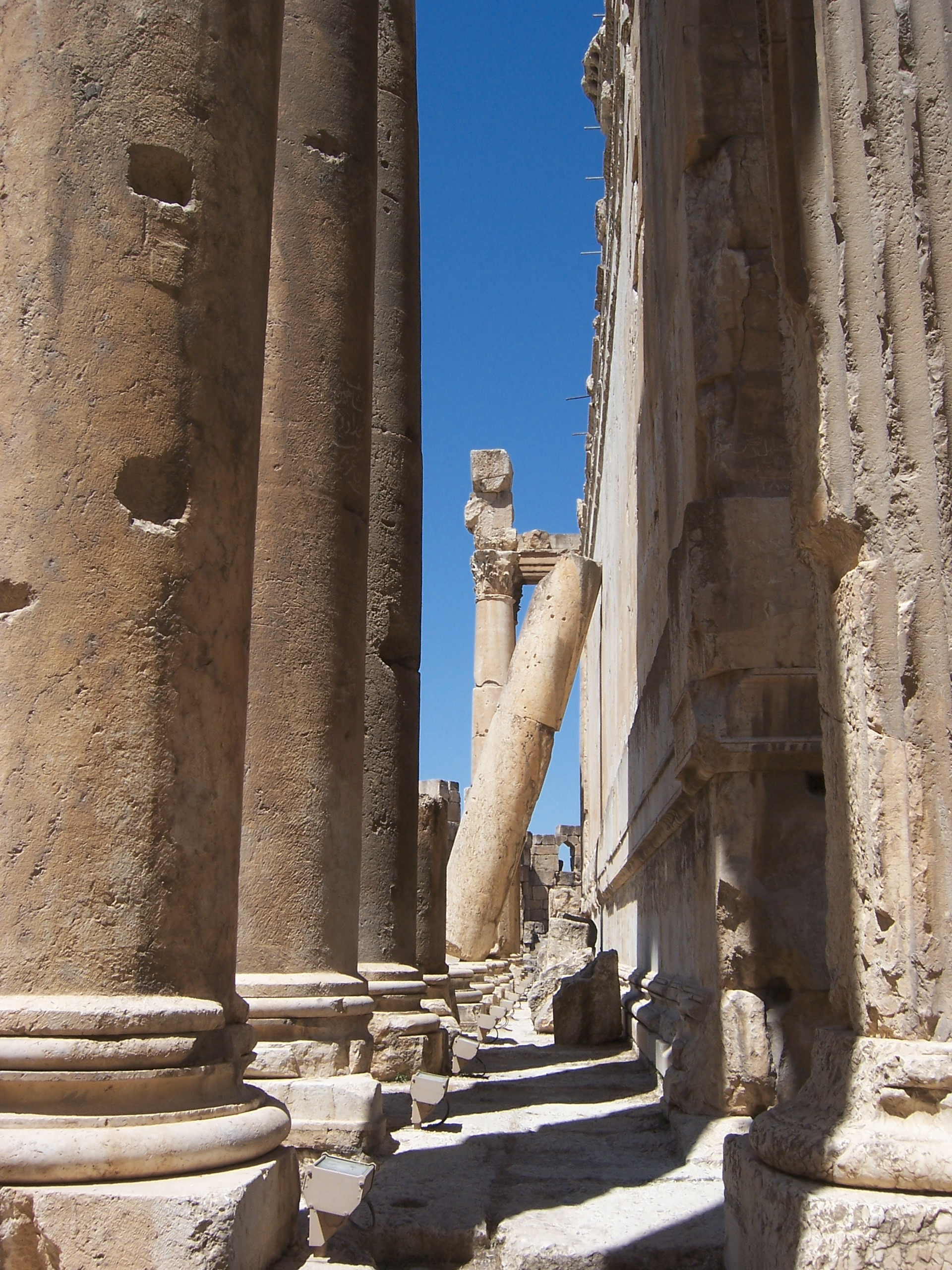

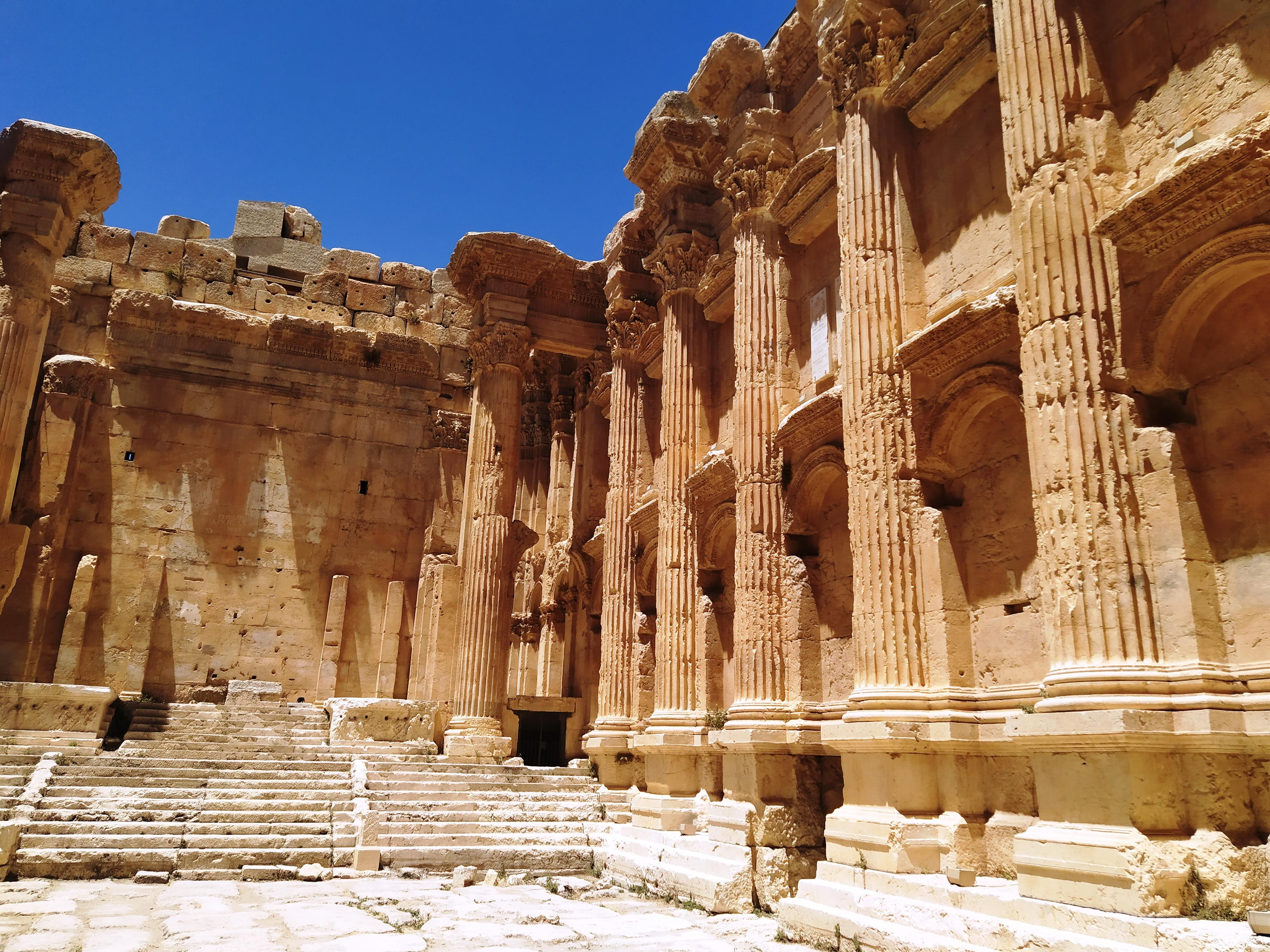

== Bibliography ==
- Butcher, Kevin (2003). Roman Syria and the Near East. Los Angeles: J. Paul Getty Museum. ISBN 9780892367153.
- Gorirossi-Bourdeau, F. (1995). "A documentation in stone of Acarina in the Roman Temple of Bacchus in Baalbek, Lebanon, about 150 AD". Bull Ann Soc Ent Belgique.
- Wood, Robert (1757). The Ruins of Balbec, otherwise Heliopolis in Cœlosyria. London.
- Jessup, Samuel. Ba'albek (Picturesque Palestine, Sinai and Egypt) Ed. Appleton & Co. New York, 1881 ()
- Lewis, Norman N. (1999). "Baalbek Before and After the Earthquake of 1759: The Drawings of James Bruce". Levant. 31 (1): 241–253. doi:10.1179/lev.1999.31.1.241.
- Quintero, Mario; Seif, Assaad (2011). A Proposal for an Integrated risk preparedness strategy. Lebanon: Directorate General of Antiquities. ISBN 978-90-8169-530-5. at "A Proposal for an Integrated Risk Preparedness Strategy."
- Sabel, Pennie (2002). "Baalbek Keeps its Secrets". Stone World. 19 (9): 156–162. ProQuest 213631469.
- Sear, Frank (1982). Roman Architecture. UK: B T Batsford Ltd, UK. ISBN 9781134635788.
- Segal, Arthur (2000). "Colossal Engimas". Archaeology Odyssey: 50–53, 56, 58, 60–61.
- Wood, Josh (August 18, 2015). "Music returns to Baalbek ruins, defying Lebanon's security concerns". National.
- "Lebanon: Baalbek Festival". The Globe and Mail (1936-Current). May 7, 1997. ProQuest 1400733423.
