= 2nd century in Lebanon =

- Key event(s)
- End of Pax Romana, Year of the Five Emperors
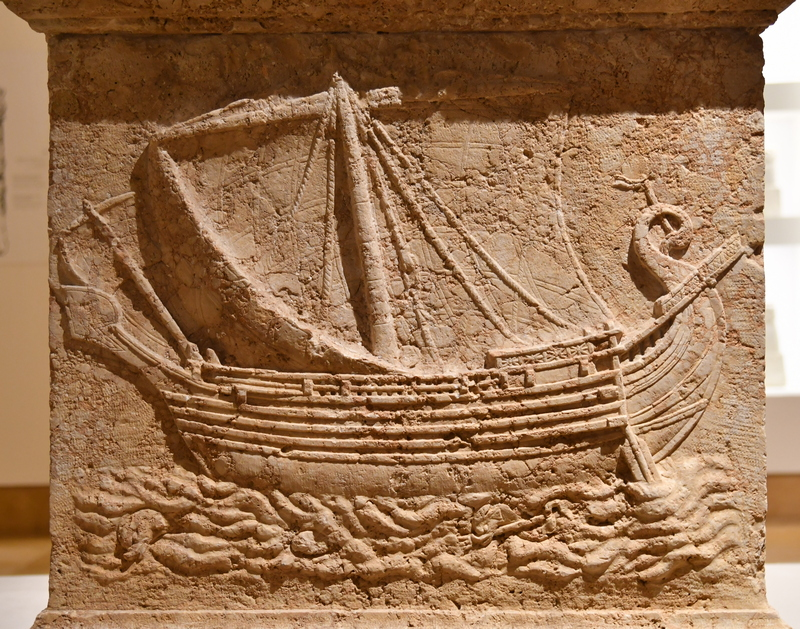
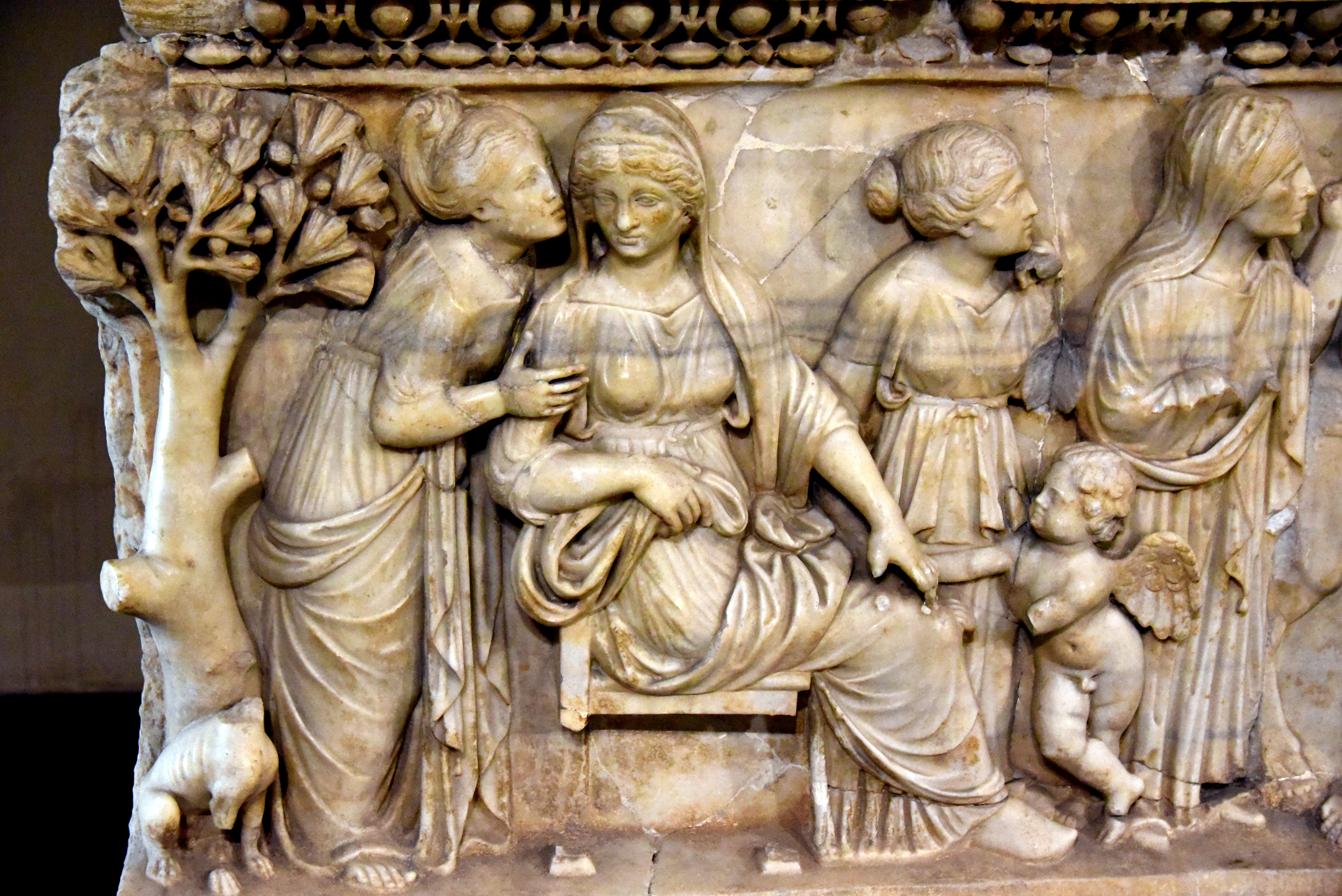
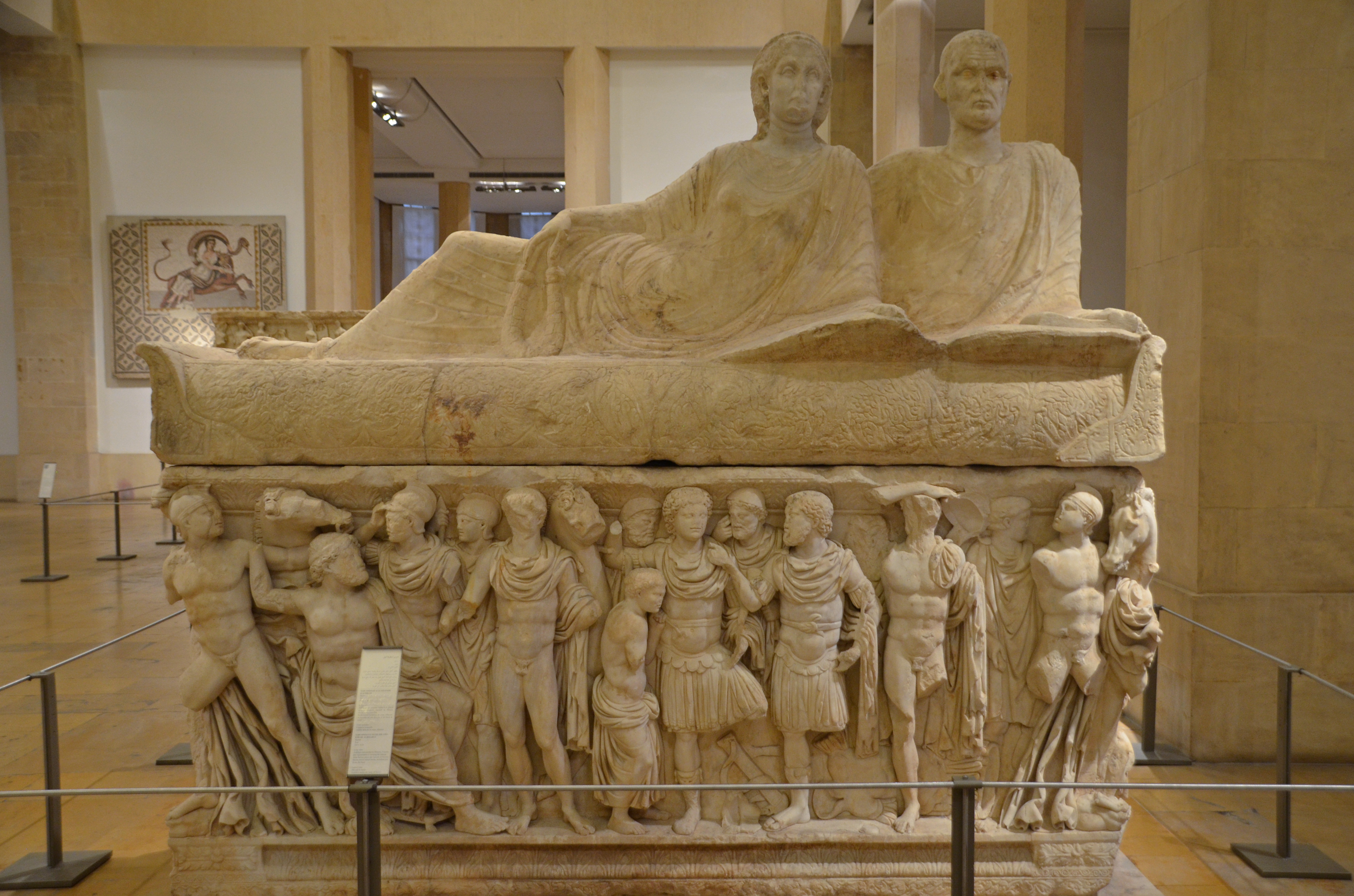
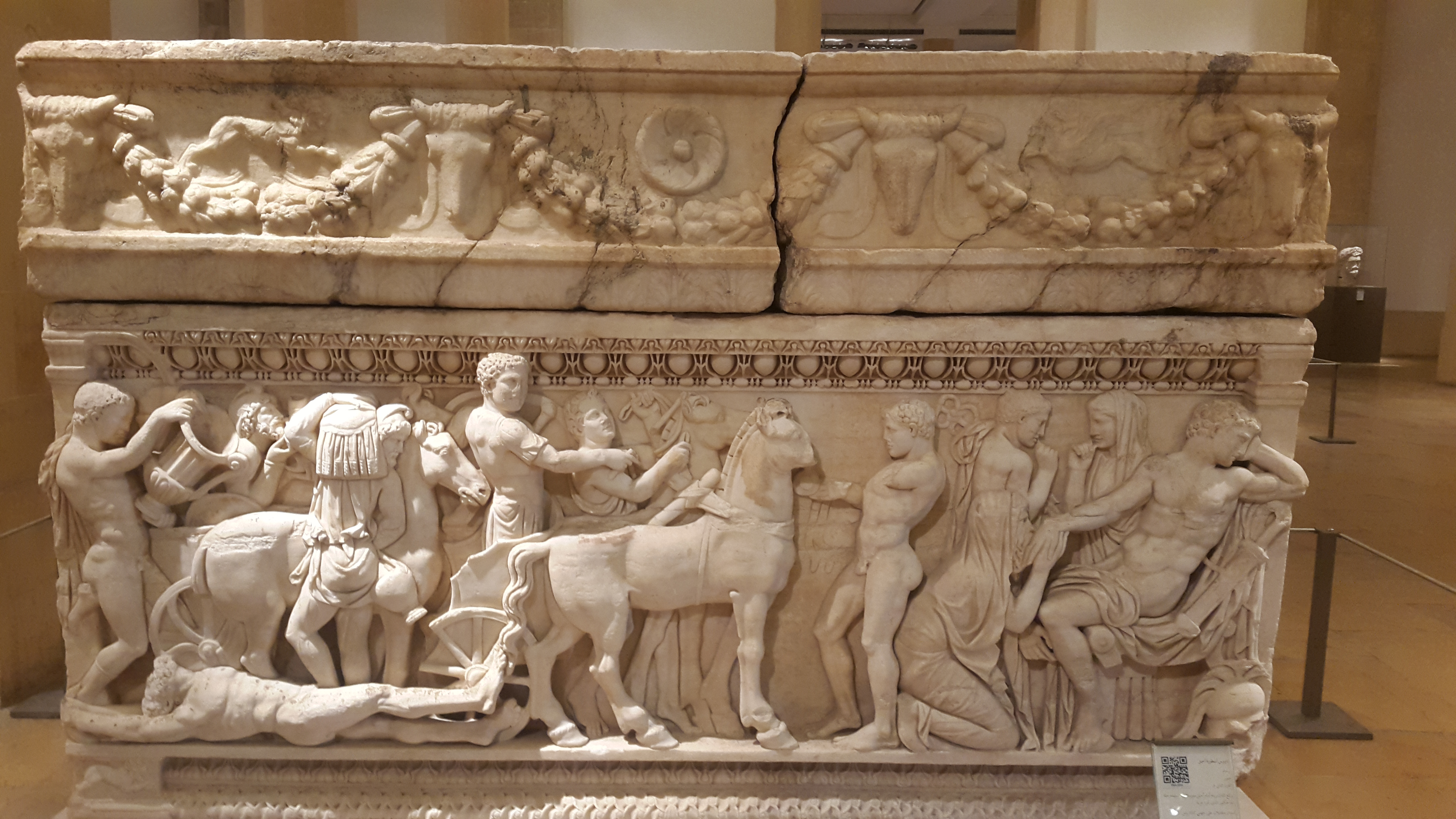
- Photos of 2nd century Lebanese Roman sarcophagi.
- Chronology
- ← 1st century; 2nd century; 3rd century →

This article lists historical events that occurred between 101–200 in modern-day Lebanon or regarding its people.

== Administration ==
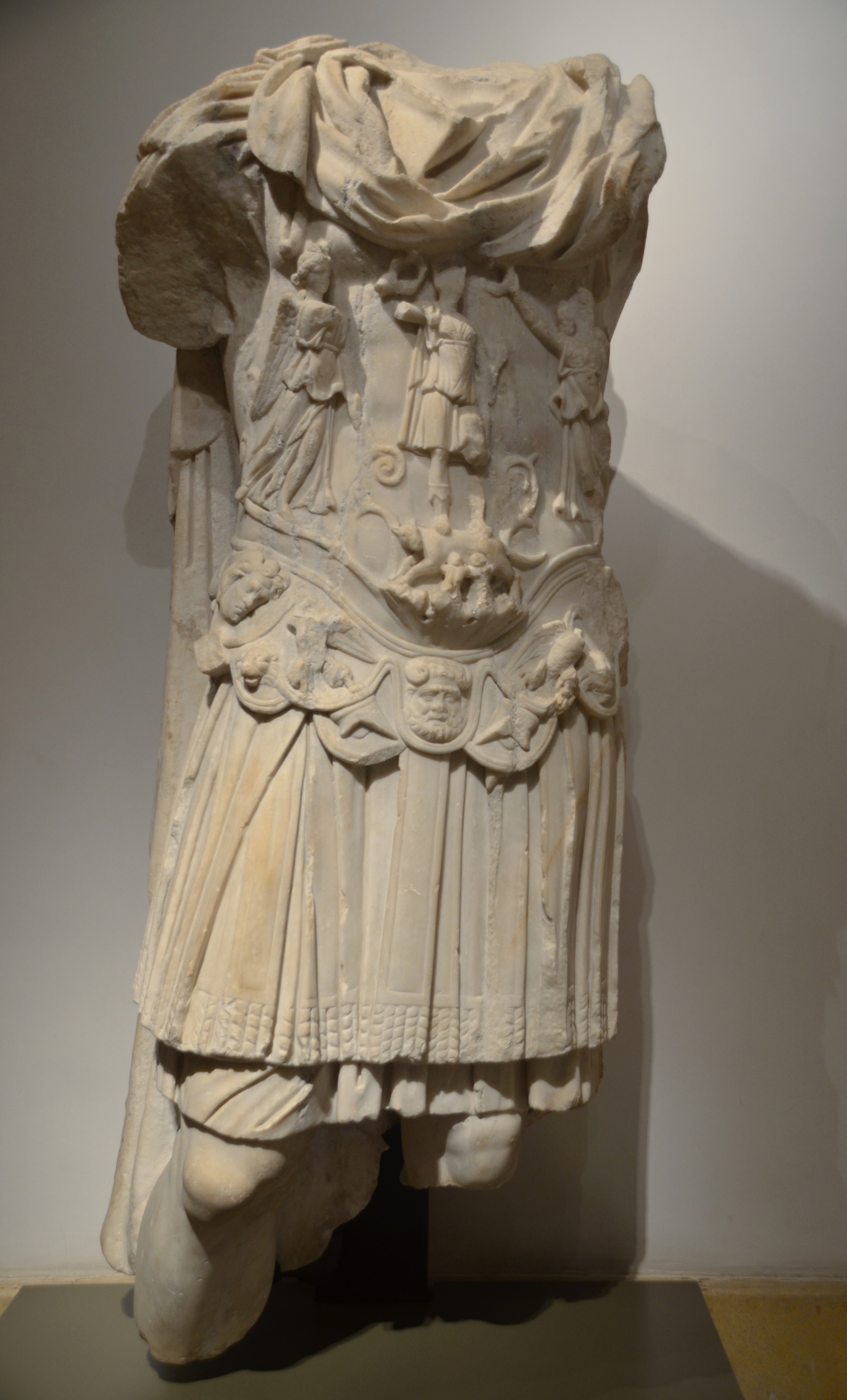
Cuirassed statue of Roman Emperor Hadrian from Tyre, National Museum of Beirut, Lebanon.

Roman emperor Hadrian (reigned 117–138) is said to have considered a division of the overly large province of Syria in 123–124 AD, but it was not until shortly after c. 194 AD that Septimius Severus (r. 193–211) actually undertook this, dividing the province into Syria Coele in the north and Phoenice in the south. The province was much larger than the area traditionally called Phoenicia: for example, cities like Emesa (Note: Modern-day Homs/Hims (حمص), Syria.) and Palmyra (Note: Arabic: تَدْمُر (Tadmur)) and the base of the Legio III Gallica (Note: A military unit of the Imperial Roman army) in Raphanaea (Note: Arabic: الرفنية, romanized: al-Rafaniyya; colloquial: Rafniye) were now subject to governor in Tyre. Veterans of this military unit were settled in Tyre, which also received the rank of colonia.

By creating the province of Phoenicia, Septimius Severus revived the Phoenician identity. His restoration of the ancient regional name seems to come from a deep pride in his own origin from the regions of Dido in Africa and his wife’s roots in Phoenicia.

=== War of Succession ===
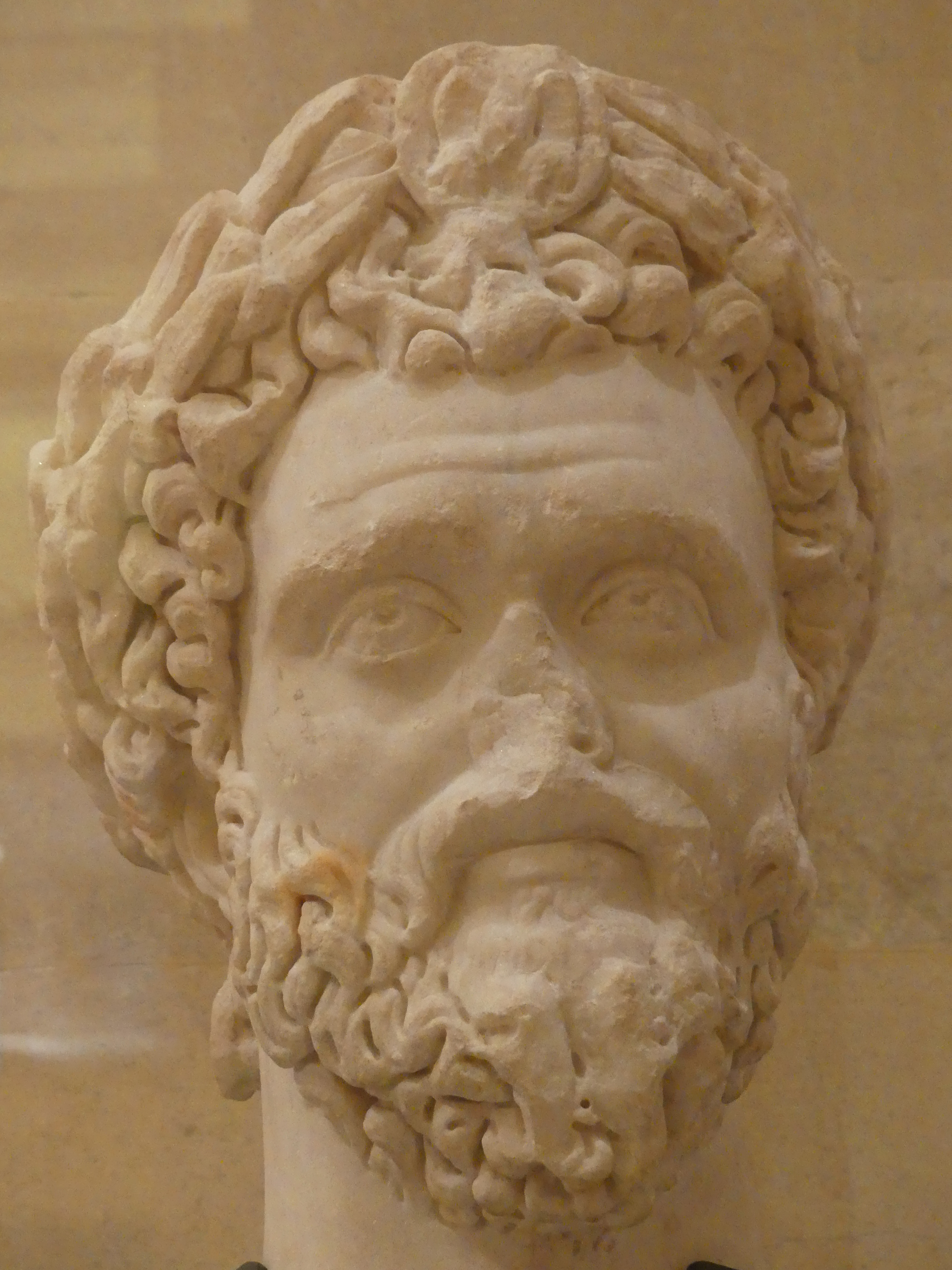
Marble head of the emperor Septimius Severus, from Tyre, on display at the National Museum of Beirut.

After the death of the 2nd century Roman emperor Commodus, a civil war erupted, in which Berytus, and Sidon supported Pescennius Niger. While the city of Tyre supported Septimius Severus, which led Niger to send Mauri (Note: Latin designation for the Berber population of Mauretania, a region in the ancient Maghreb.) javelin men and archers to sack the city. However, Niger lost the civil war, and Septimius Severus decided to show his gratitude for Tyre's support by making it the capital of Phoenice. Berytus was permitted to maintain its status as a Roman colony but lost the territory of Heliopolis, which was established as a separate colony. Ulpian, a native of Tyre, states that the grant of colonial status to Heliopolis resulted from this civil war.

=== Propraetorial Imperial Legates of Phoenicia ===
The early governors of Phoenice from the time of Septimius Severus are known mainly by inscriptions. The governors resided in Tyre.

Date	Propraetorial Imperial Legate (Governor)
193 – 194	Ti. Manilius Fuscus
198	Q. Venidius Rufus Marius Maximus L. Calvinianus

== Events ==
=== 100s ===
- Eudokia of Baalbek is beheaded in 1 March, 107 AD.

=== 110s ===
- The 115 Antioch earthquake in which Beirut suffers significant damage, occurs on 13 December 115 AD.

=== 130s ===
- Roman Emperor Hadrian visits the city of Tyre in 130/131.

=== 150s ===
- Phoenician-born Pope Anicetus is elected as bishop of Rome c. 157 AD.

=== 190s ===
- Roman emperor Commodus dies on 31 December 192, leading to a war of succession, in which each Lebanese city took side of either Septimius Severus or Pescennius Niger.
- In AD 193, Septimius Severus grants Baalbek ius Italicum rights.
- Niger is defeated and beheaded in 194, ending the war of succession.
- The Roman province of Phoenice is created c. 194 AD.
- Tyre becomes the capital of Phoenice, 198 AD.

== Culture ==
=== Sports ===
Athletic competitions following the classical model persisted in the region during the second century AD, taking place in public venues such as gymnasiums. An athlete from Aphrodisias in Caria, in 165 AD, recorded his victories, listing events in various Phoenician cities: the men’s pankration in Berytus, the men’s pankration in Tyre, and the men’s pankration in Hieropolis.

=== Wildlife conservation ===
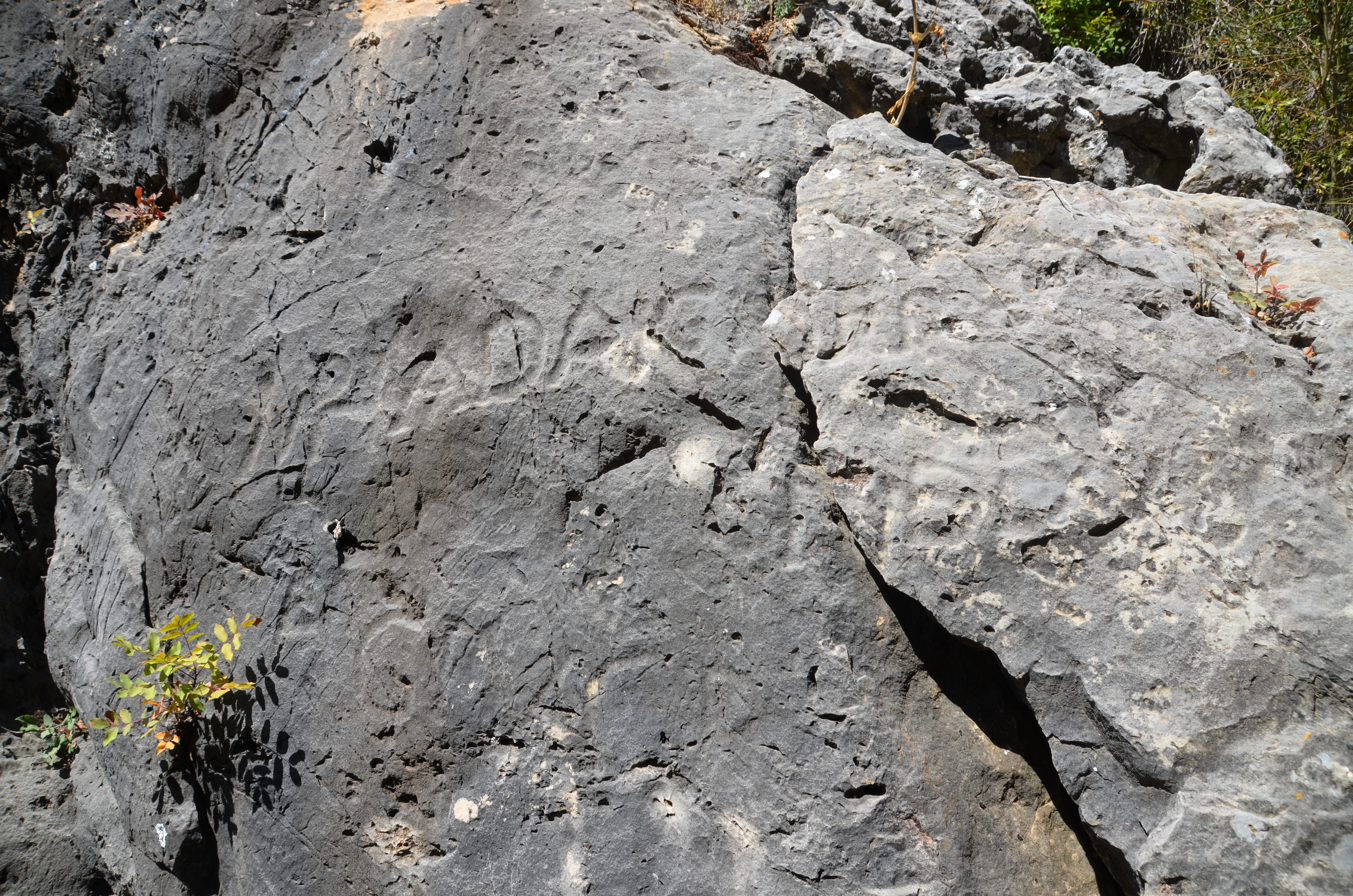
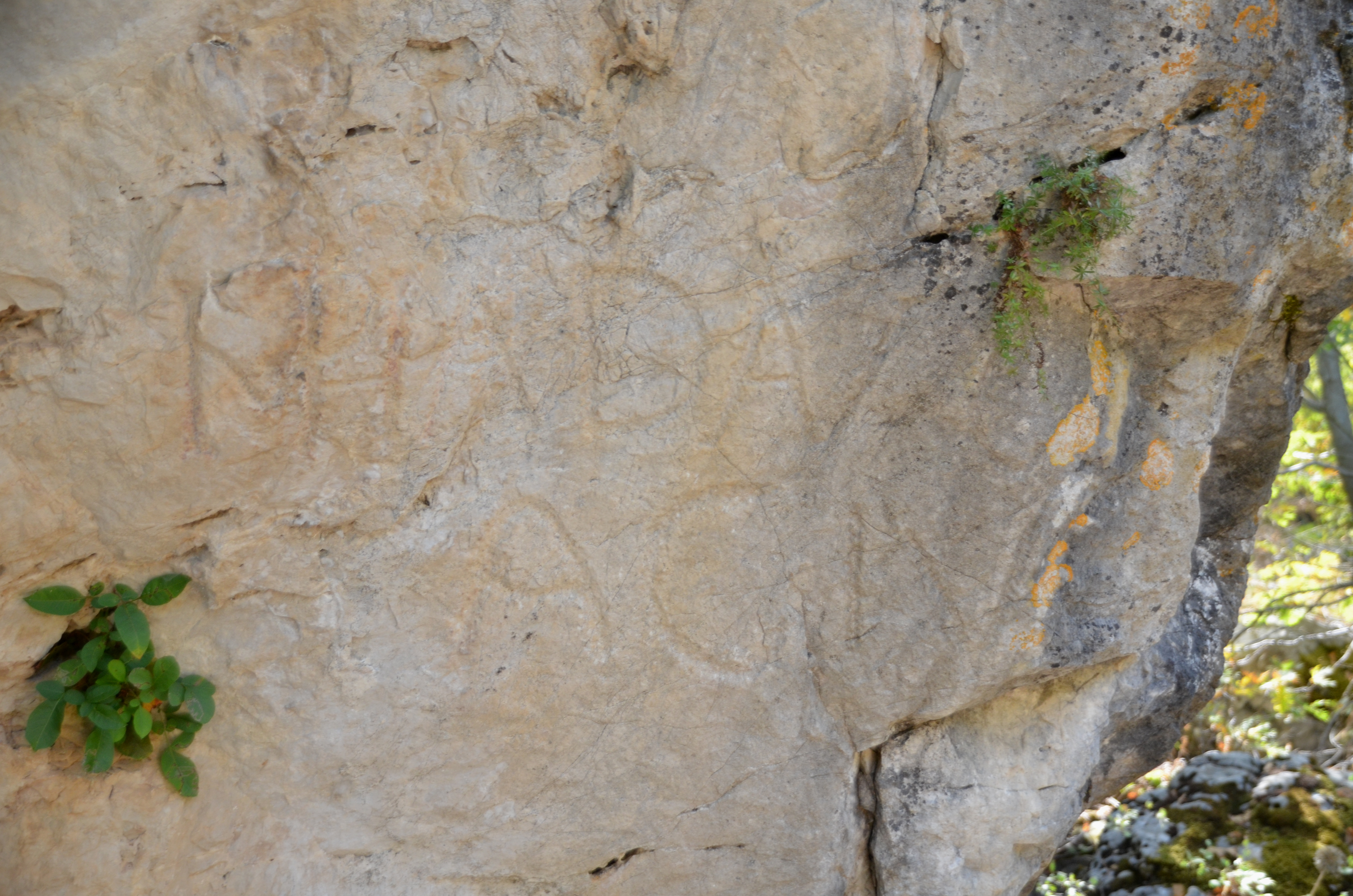
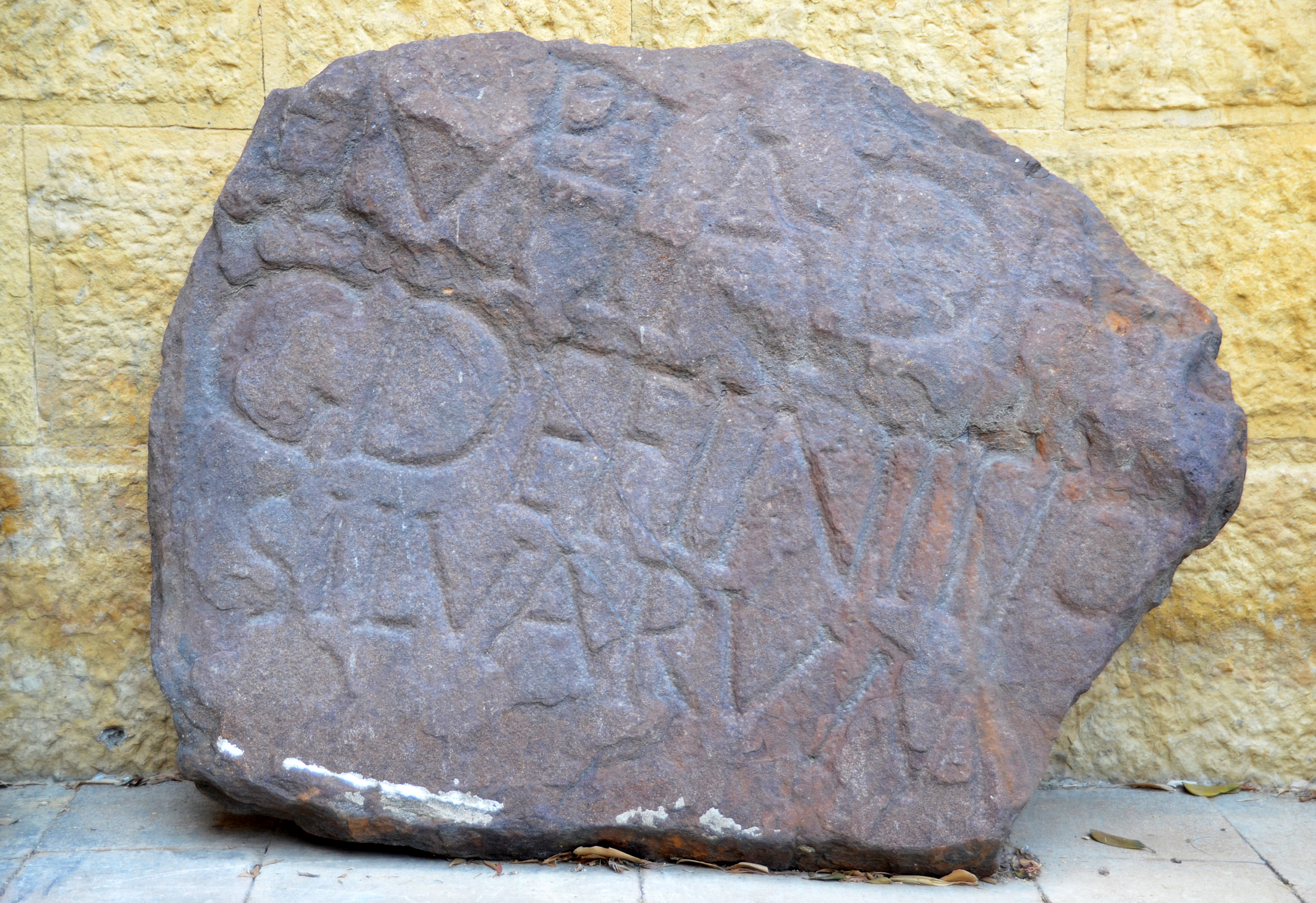
Hadrian's inscriptions of boundary stones, Lebanon.

The first attempt to conserve the Lebanese cedar was made during the 2nd century by the Roman emperor Hadrian; he created an imperial forest and ordered it marked by inscribed boundary stones, two of which are in the museum of the American University of Beirut. Material finds of this early type of wildlife conservation is provided by 200 inscriptions engraved on rocks all over the northern part of Mount Lebanon.

== Architecture ==
Based on literary evidence, by the early second century AD, Berytus featured various public structures, including halls, porticoes, temples, marketplaces, a theater, an amphitheater, and baths. The buildings and streets were decorated with statues and sculptures.

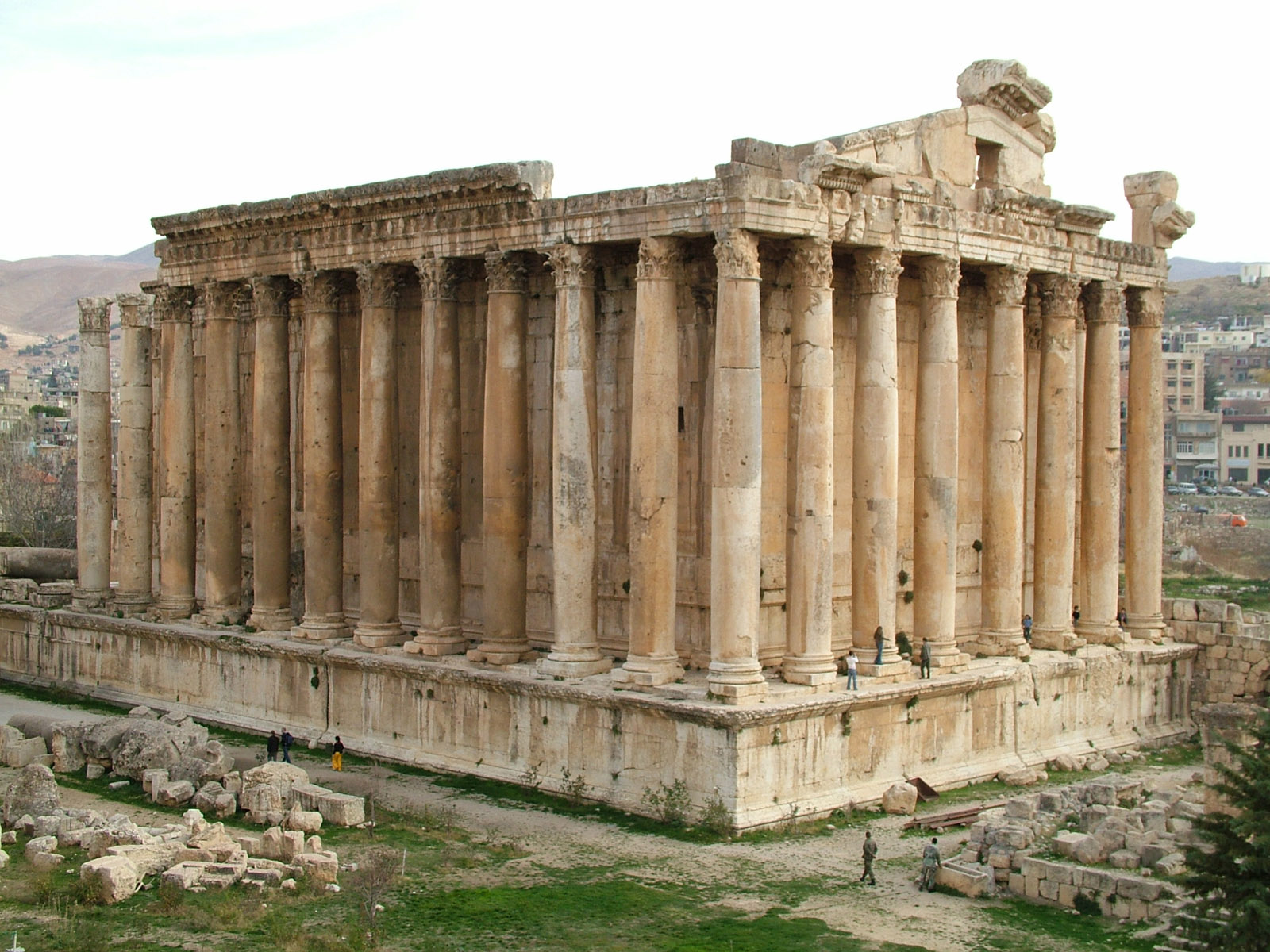
Temple of Bacchus, Baalbek.

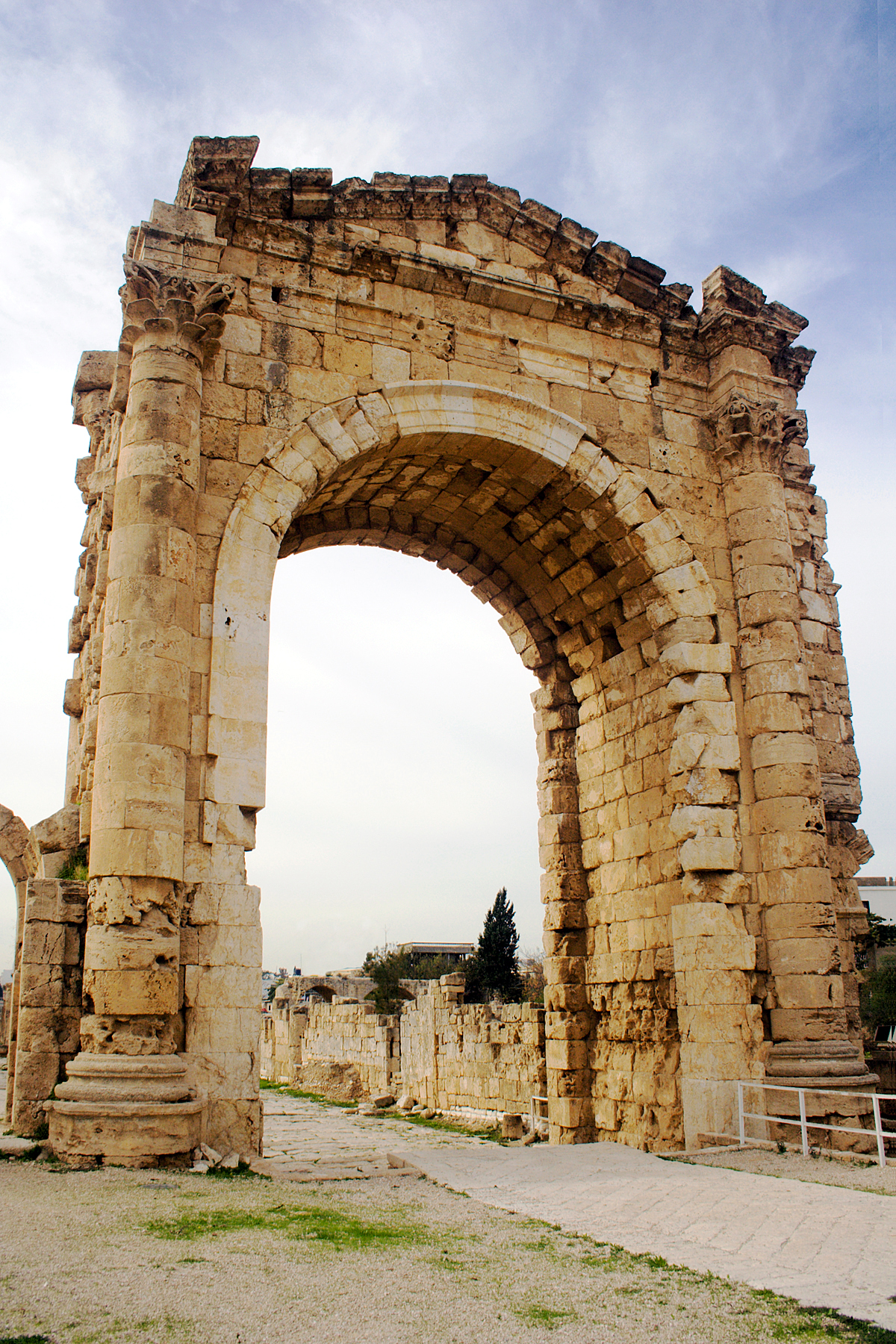
Triumphal arch of Tyre.

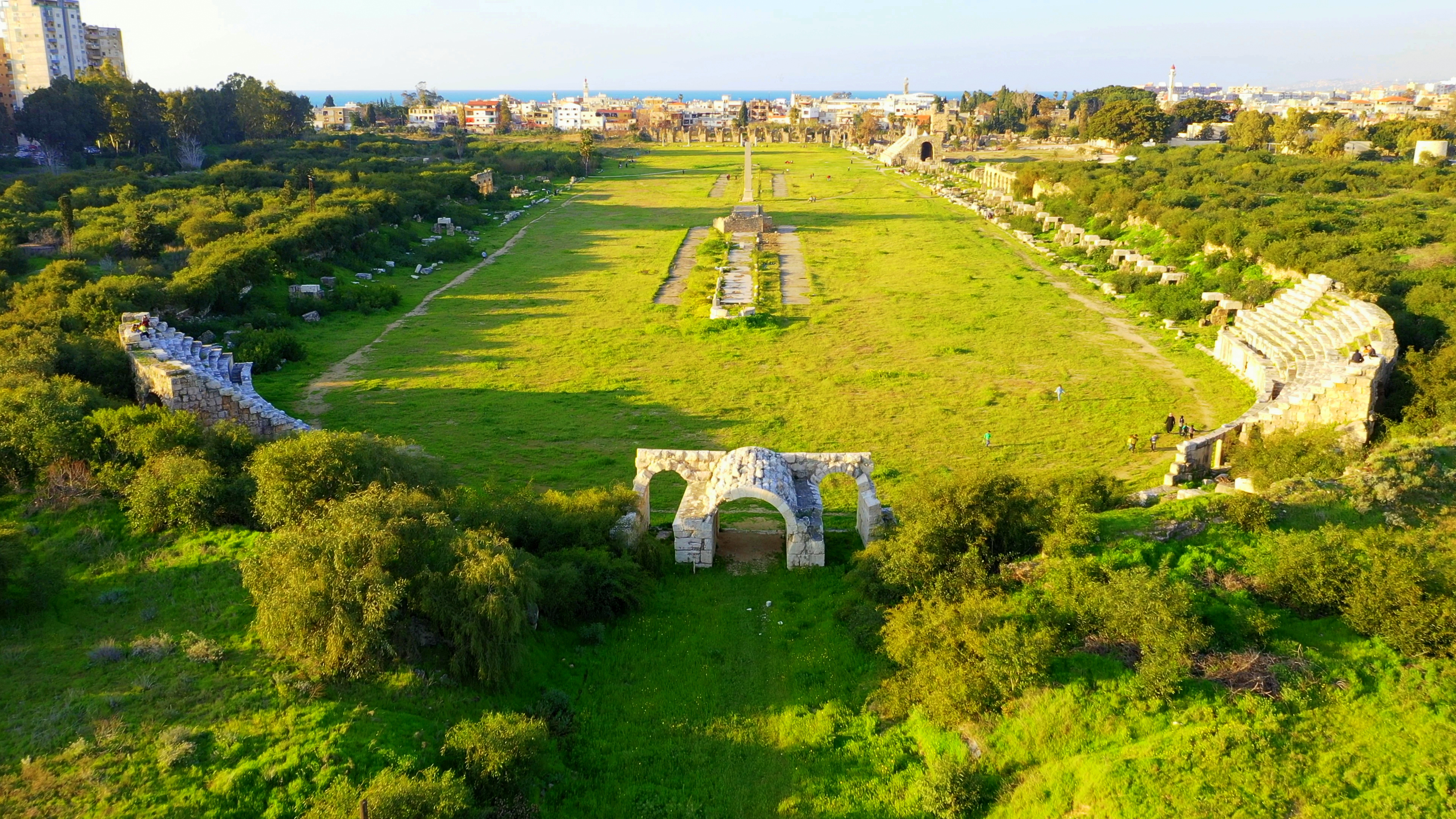
The Tyre Hippodrome.

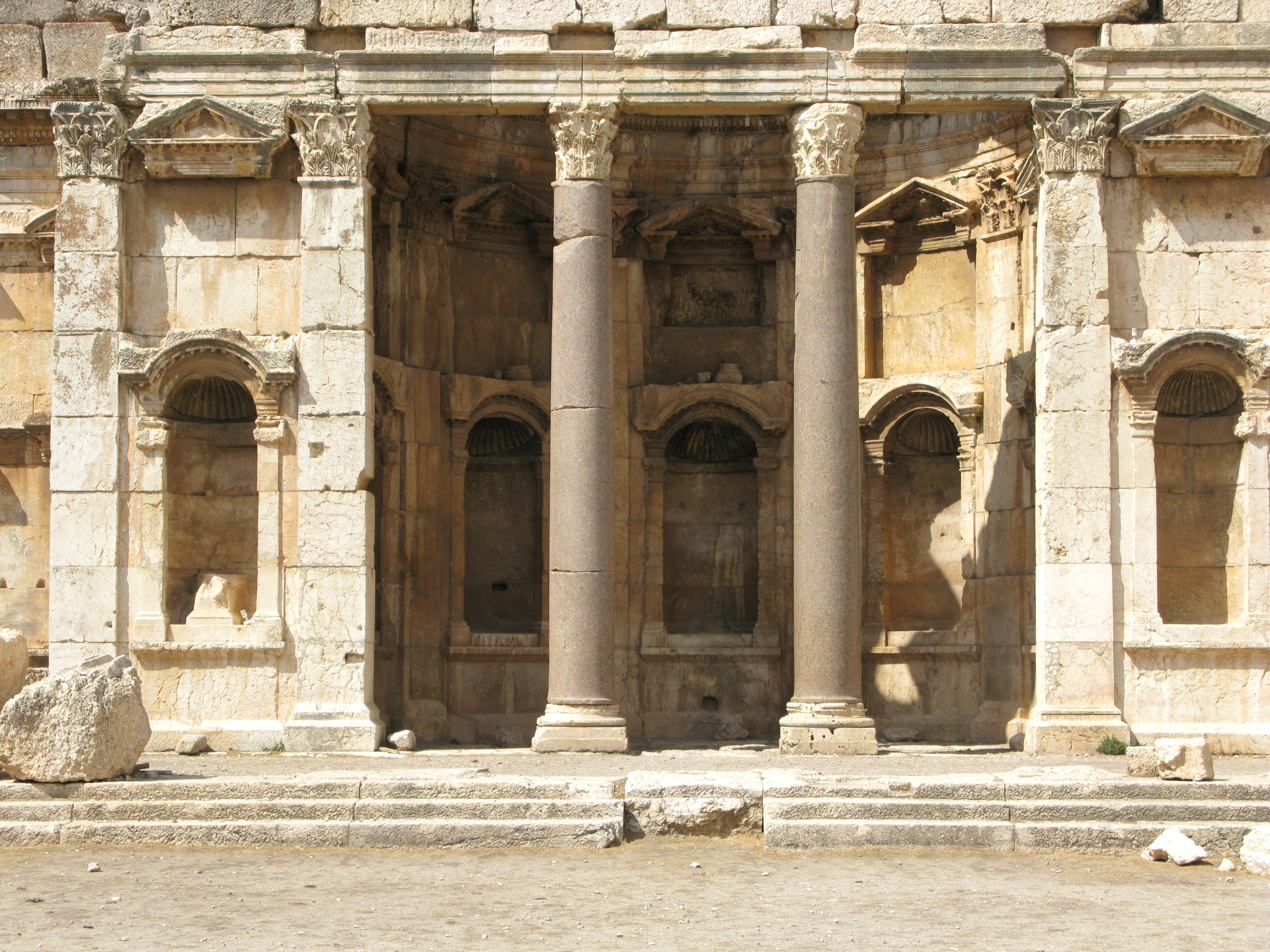
The Exedra around the Great Court, Roman Heliopolis.
- 2nd century CE Roman temple of Yanouh.
- Temple of Bacchus, possibly during the reign of Roman Emperor Antoninus Pius (r. AD 138-161).
- Triumphal arch at El-Buss.
- Numerous 2nd century small temples and other sanctuaries in the vicinity of the temple district of Heliopolis, today's Baalbek, on the edge of the Bekaa.
- Tyre Hippodrome.
- the Great Court Complex of the temple of Jupiter, with its porticoes, exedrae, altars and basins.

== People ==
=== 100s ===
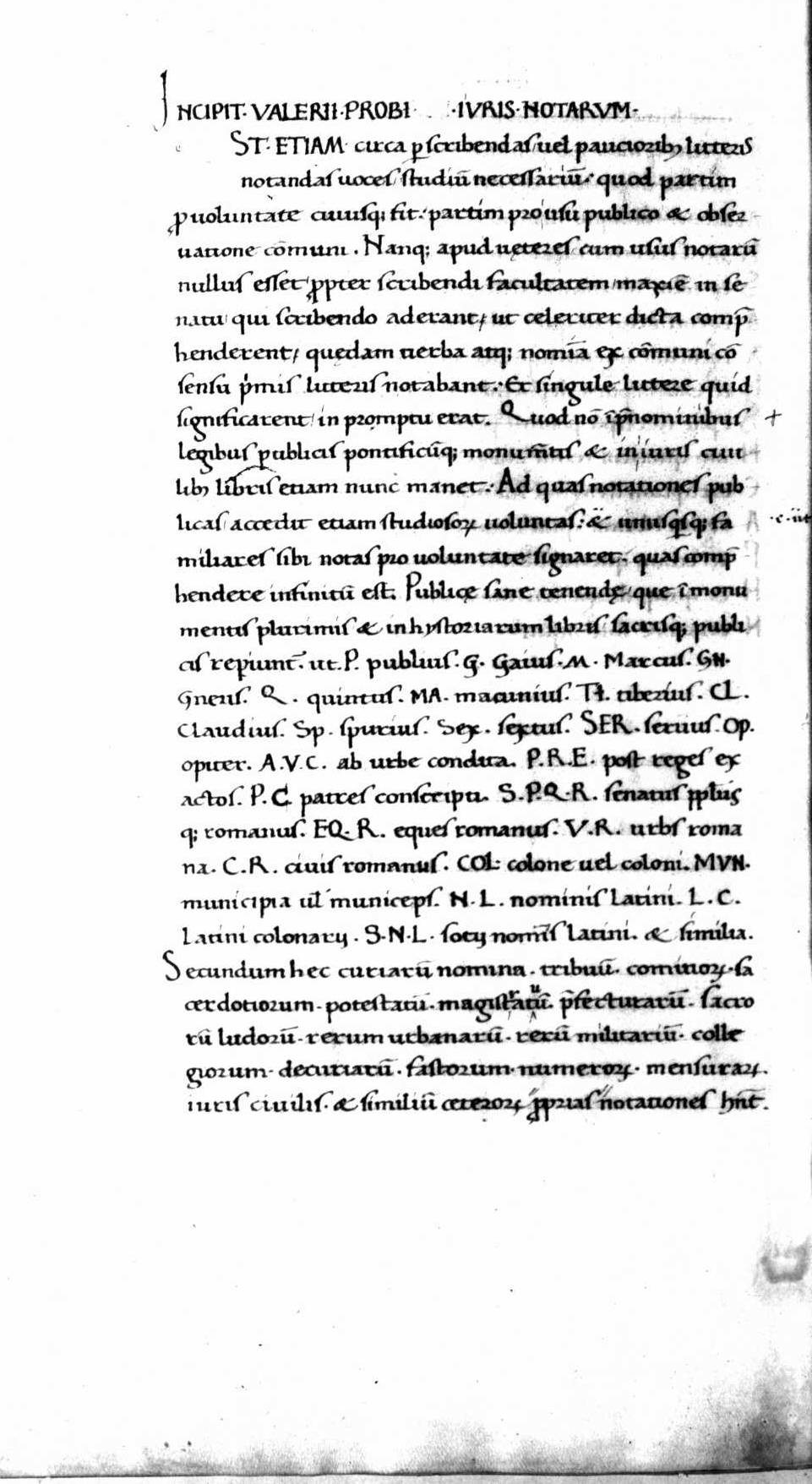
Probus, Marcus Valerius – De iuris notarum, fragm., 15th-century – BEIC 14822487.

- Lebanese Roman grammarian and critic Marcus Valerius Probus, dies in 105 AD.

=== 110s ===
- Adrianus of Tyre, a sophist of ancient Athens who flourished under the emperors Marcus Aurelius and Commodus is born in 113 AD.

=== 130s ===
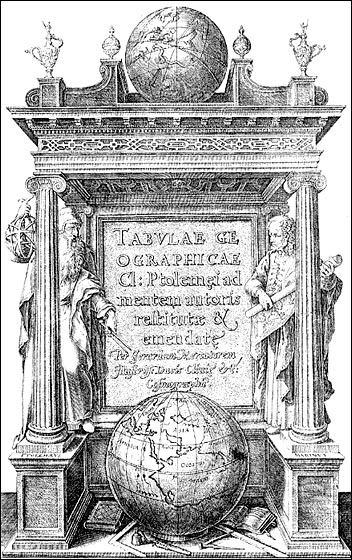
Cover for "Tabulae geographica" (1578), work of Ptolemy. Depicted are both Ptolemy and Marinus of Tyre, very likely in this order.

- Marinus of Tyre, a Greek geographer, cartographer and mathematician, who founded mathematical geography and provided the underpinnings of Claudius Ptolemy's influential Geography, dies in 130 AD.

=== 140s ===
- Lebanese antiquarian writer of grammatical, lexical and historical works and writer of Phoenician history Philo of Byblos dies in 141 AD.

=== 170s ===
- The famous Lebanese jurist Ulpian, Latin: Gnaeus Domitius Annius Ulpianus; one of the great legal authorities, is born in Tyre, possibly c. 170 AD.

=== 190s ===
- Adrianus of Tyre dies in 192/193 AD.

== Sources ==
- Eißfeldt, Otto (1941). "Phoiniker (Phoinike)". Realencyclopädie der Classischen Altertumswissenschaft. Vol. Band XX, Halbband 39, Philon–Pignus. pp. 350–379.
- Linda Jones Hall, Roman Berytus: Beirut in late antiquity (2004)
- Paturel, Simone (2019-07-01), Baalbek-Heliopolis, the Bekaa, and Berytus from 100 BCE to 400 CE, BRILL, ISBN 978-90-04-40073-3
- Shackley, Myra (1 October 2004). "Managing the Cedars of Lebanon: Botanical Gardens or Living Forests?". Current Issues in Tourism. 7 (4–5): 417–425. doi:10.1080/13683500408667995. ISSN 1368-3500. S2CID 153516841.
