= Tripolis (region of Phoenicia) =

Tripoli area in Lebanon

Tripolis (Greek: Τρίπολις; meaning "three cities") was a maritime district in ancient Phoenicia. The center of the confederation of the three Phoenician cities of Tyre, Sidon, and Aradus. Through the ages, it evolved to become the present Lebanese city of Tripoli.

During the 3rd Century, Tripolis was the site of a Roman mint from around 270 to 286.
