= 3rd century in Lebanon =

- Key event(s)
- Third Century Crisis
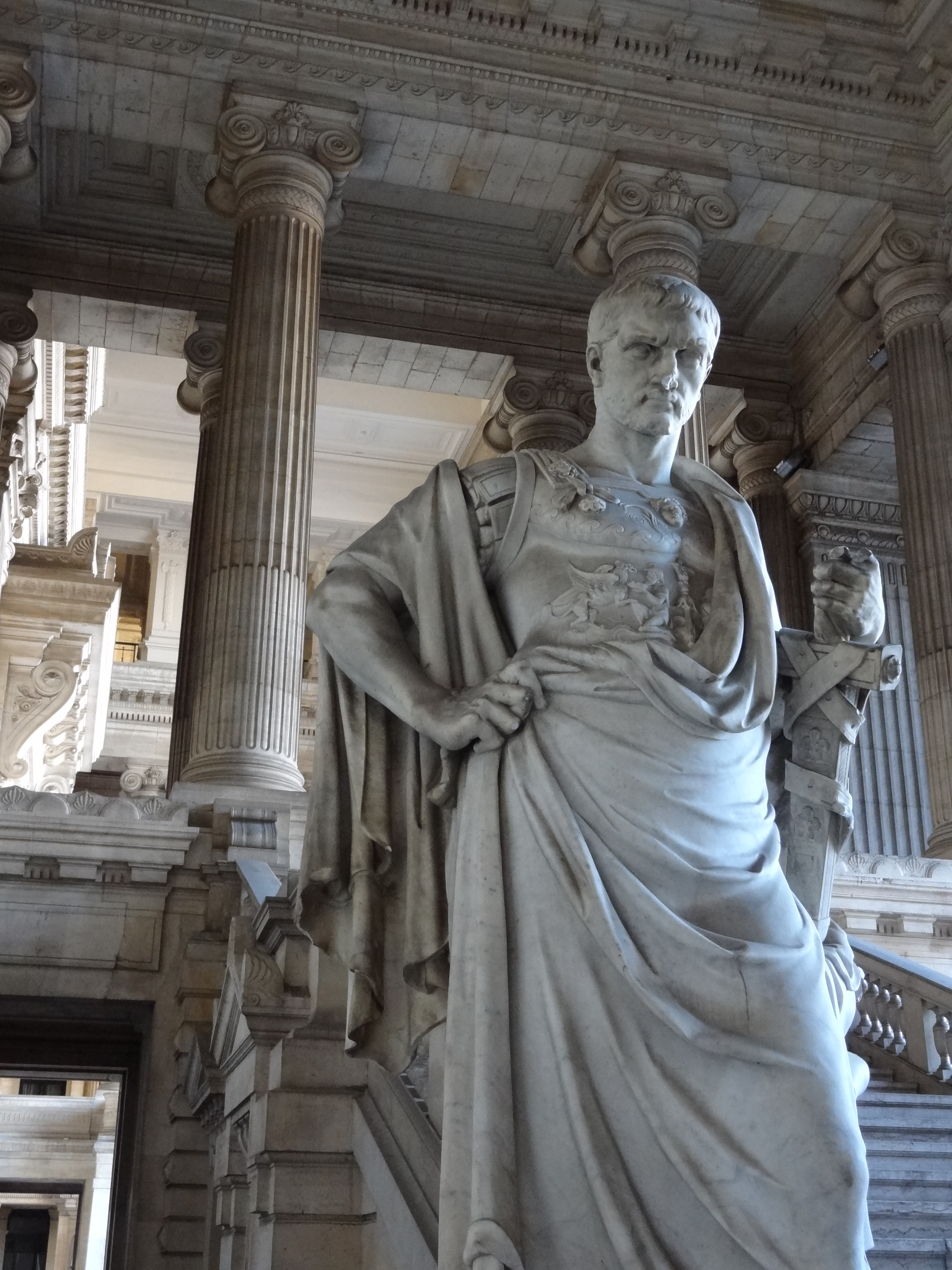
- Statue of Ulpian, a Lebanese Roman jurist born in Tyre. He was considered one of the great legal authorities of his time and was one of the five jurists upon whom decisions were to be based according to the Law of Citations of Valentinian III.
- Chronology
- ← 2nd century; 3rd century; 4th century →

This article lists historical events that occurred between 201–300 in modern-day Lebanon or regarding its people.

== Administration ==
=== Severan dynasty ===
During the early third century, coastal cities of Phoenicia and numerous "Punic" cities of North Africa saw substantial construction by Septimius Severus and his successors, who specifically adorned Lepcis Magna, which was connected to the metropolis of Tyre by coins and inscriptions. Tyre's coins from the Severan period depict Dido overseeing the establishment of Carthage. Thus, by exalting the Aeneid's author and characters, the Severan dynasty purposefully promoted a Phoenician-Roman connection.

==== Reign of Elagabalus ====
Tyre was the capital of Phoenice, but the Roman emperor Elagabalus (r. 218–222) raised his native Emesa (modern-day Homs) to co-capital, leading to a rivalry between the two cities as the head of the province. However, Elagabalus is recognized for bestowing imperial favor on Berytus, along with other cities in the region, and a coin from Berytus during his reign depicts a grand archway adorned with columns and sculptures.

=== Propraetorial Imperial Legates of Phoenicia ===
Date	Propraetorial Imperial Legates (Governors)
c. 207	Domitius Leo Procillianus
213	D. Pius Cassius
Between 268 and 270	Salvius Theodorus
Between 284 and 305	L. Artorius Pius Maximus
292 – 293	Crispinus

=== Military ===
Since the time of Septimius Severus, it had been the practice to assign not more than two legions to each frontier province, and, although in some provinces one legion was sometimes deemed sufficient, the upper limit was not exceeded. This policy appears to have been continued during the third century AD, as seen in the case of Aurelian raising the garrisons of Phoenice to the normal strength of two legions. Furthermore, during this century, the Third Legio Gallica was stationed in Tyre or Sidon.

=== Coinage ===
During the reign of the Emperor Philip I the Arab (244-249 CE), bronze coins were struck at Heliopolis in honour of the legions Fifth Macedonia and Eighth Augusta.

== Events ==
=== 210s ===
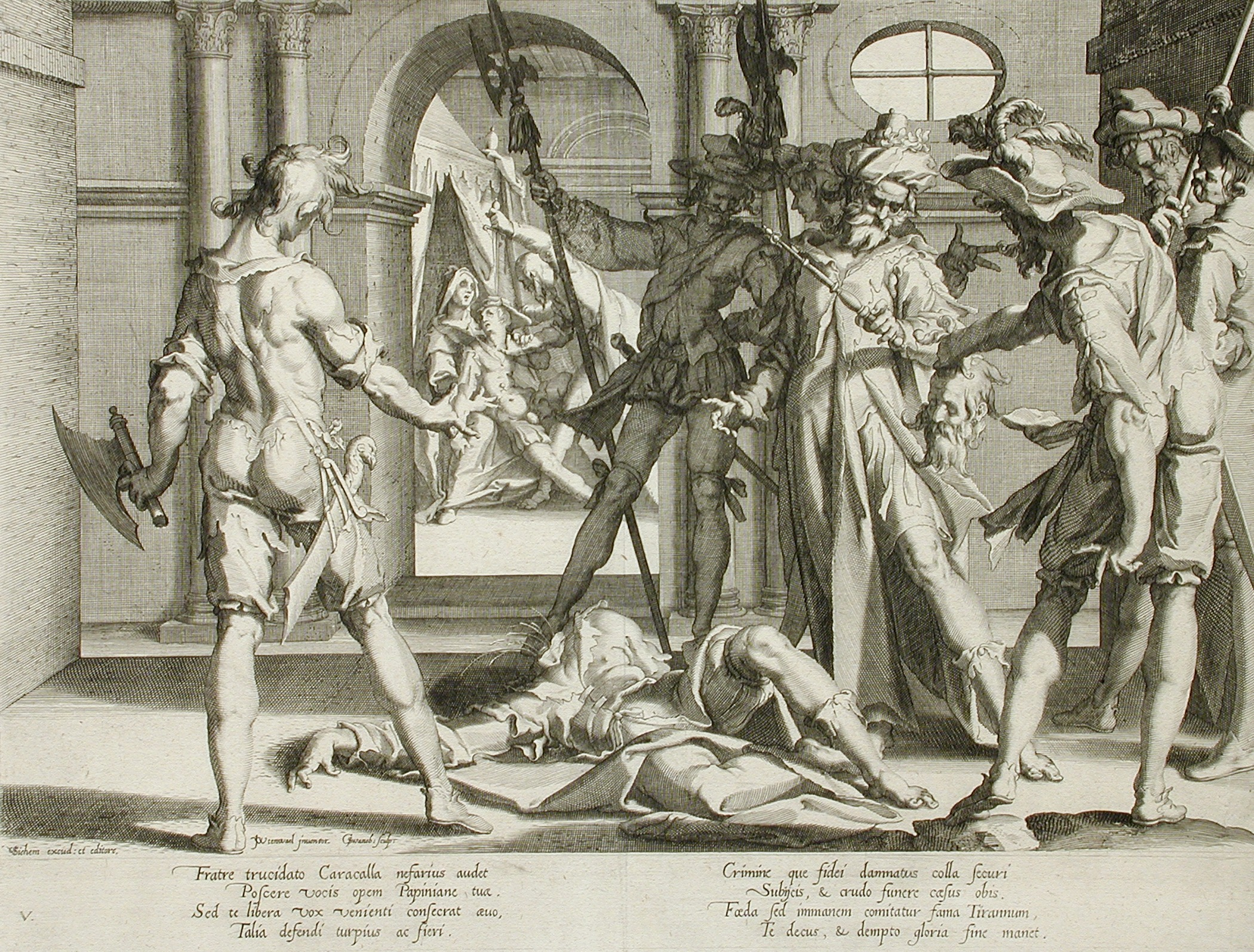
Willem Swanenburgh, after Joachim Anthonisz Wtewael, Beheading of the Roman Judge Papinian, 1606

- The Phoenician-born Papinian, a celebrated Roman jurist, magister libellorum, attorney general (advocatus fisci) and, praetorian prefect is murdered in 212 AD.

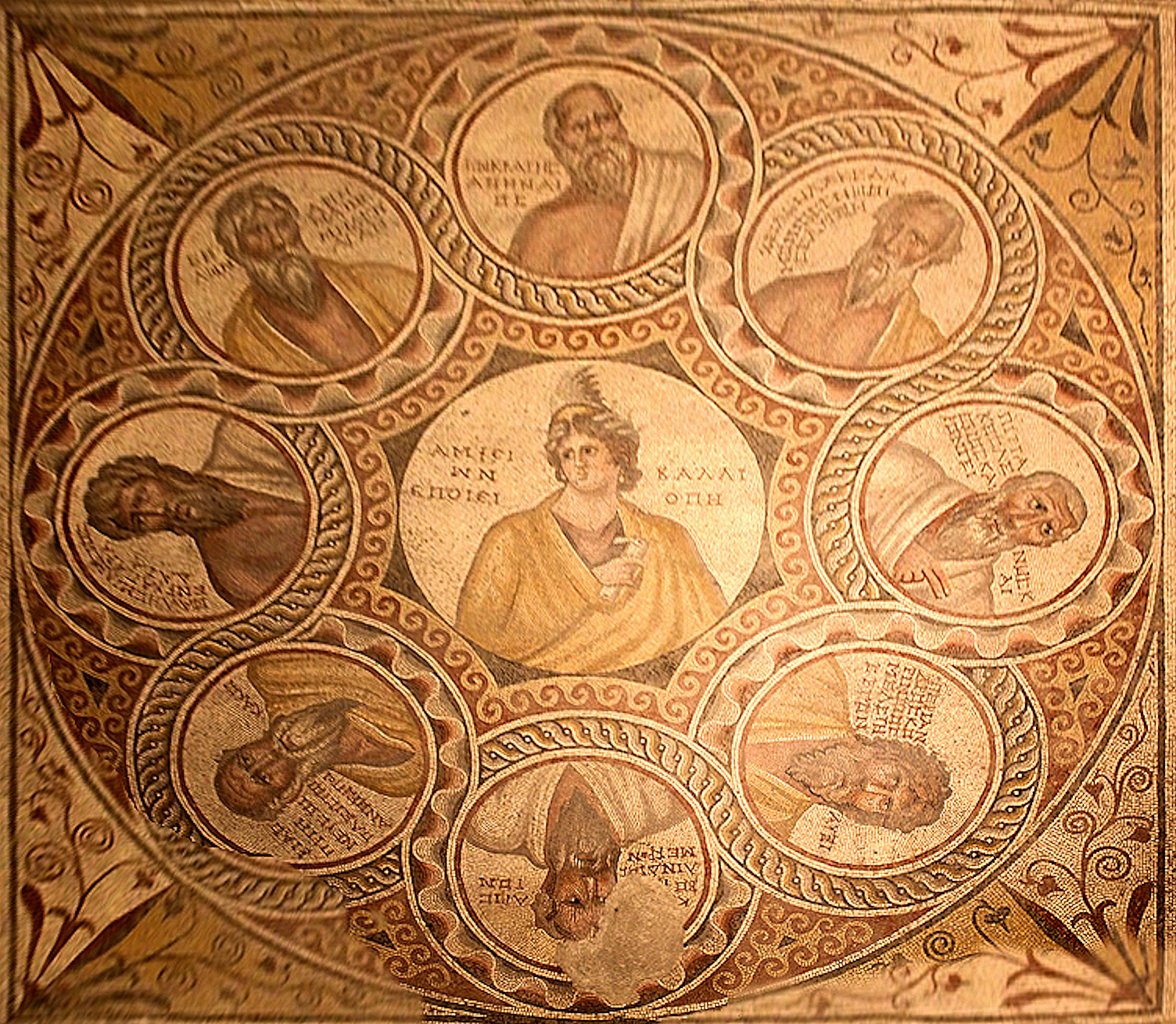
Seven Wise Men Mosaic: Calliope, surrounded by Socrates and seven wise men (Baalbeck, 3rd century A.D.)

- Septimius Severus' wife Julia Domna and son Caracalla tour in Baalbek, 215 AD.
- Gessius Marcianus, native of Arqa and a Roman aristocrat and step-father of Severus Alexander, is murdered in 218 AD.

=== 220s ===
- The Tyrian-born Ulpian, Latin: Gnaeus Domitius Annius Ulpianus; a Roman jurist and one of the great legal authorities, under Severus Alexander, serves as praetorian prefect from 222 AD.
- Ulpian is murdered in 228.

=== 230s ===
- The Third century Crisis begins with the assassination of the Lebanese-born Roman emperor Severus Alexander, 21/22 March 235 AD.
- Beirut is mentioned for the first time as a major center for the study of law in writing in the works of Gregory Thaumaturgus, 238/239 AD.

=== 250s ===
- Marinus is metropolitan bishop of Tyre, c. 250.

=== 270s ===
- The Palmyrene Empire is established in 270 AD with the start of Zenobia's expedition against the Tanukhids in the spring of the same year, leading to the occupation of Roman Phoenice by the Syrian Palmyrenes.

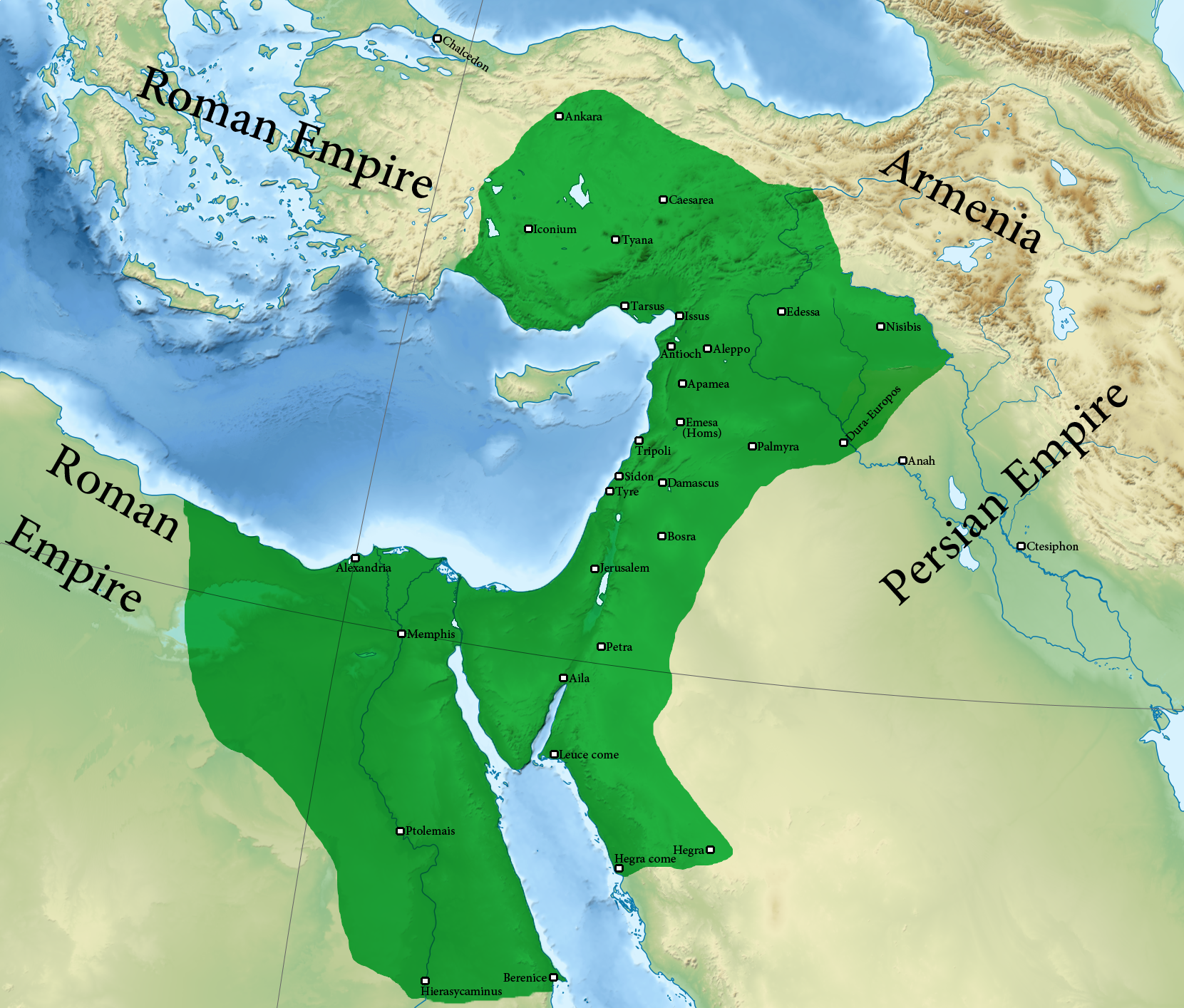
The Palmyrene Empire in 271

- Pagan temples are attested in a Greek inscription mentioning the date 272 AD found in the Mar Mama church in Ehden.
- The Palmyrene Empire is reconquered by the Romans, 273 AD.
- A Roman mint is established in Tripolis, 273/274 AD.

=== 280s ===
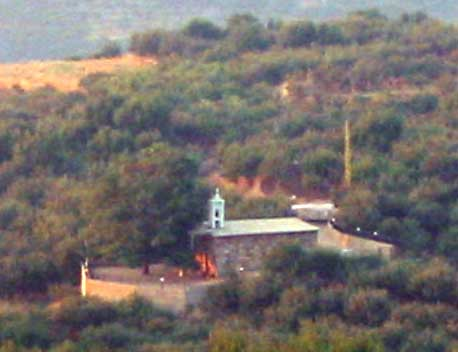
Saint Moura Church, Kfarsghab, Lebanon.

- Saint Moura, an Egyptian Saint that is almost exclusively celebrated amongst Maronites, is martyred in 283 AD, Ansena, Egypt.
- The Third century Crisis ends with the ascension of Diocletian and his implementation of reforms in 284 AD.
- The Roman mint in Tripolis closes down in 286/287 AD.

=== 290s ===
- Aquilina, a native of Byblos and a Christian child, dies in 293 AD, shortly before the executioner could carry out the decapitation sentenced on her for her religion.

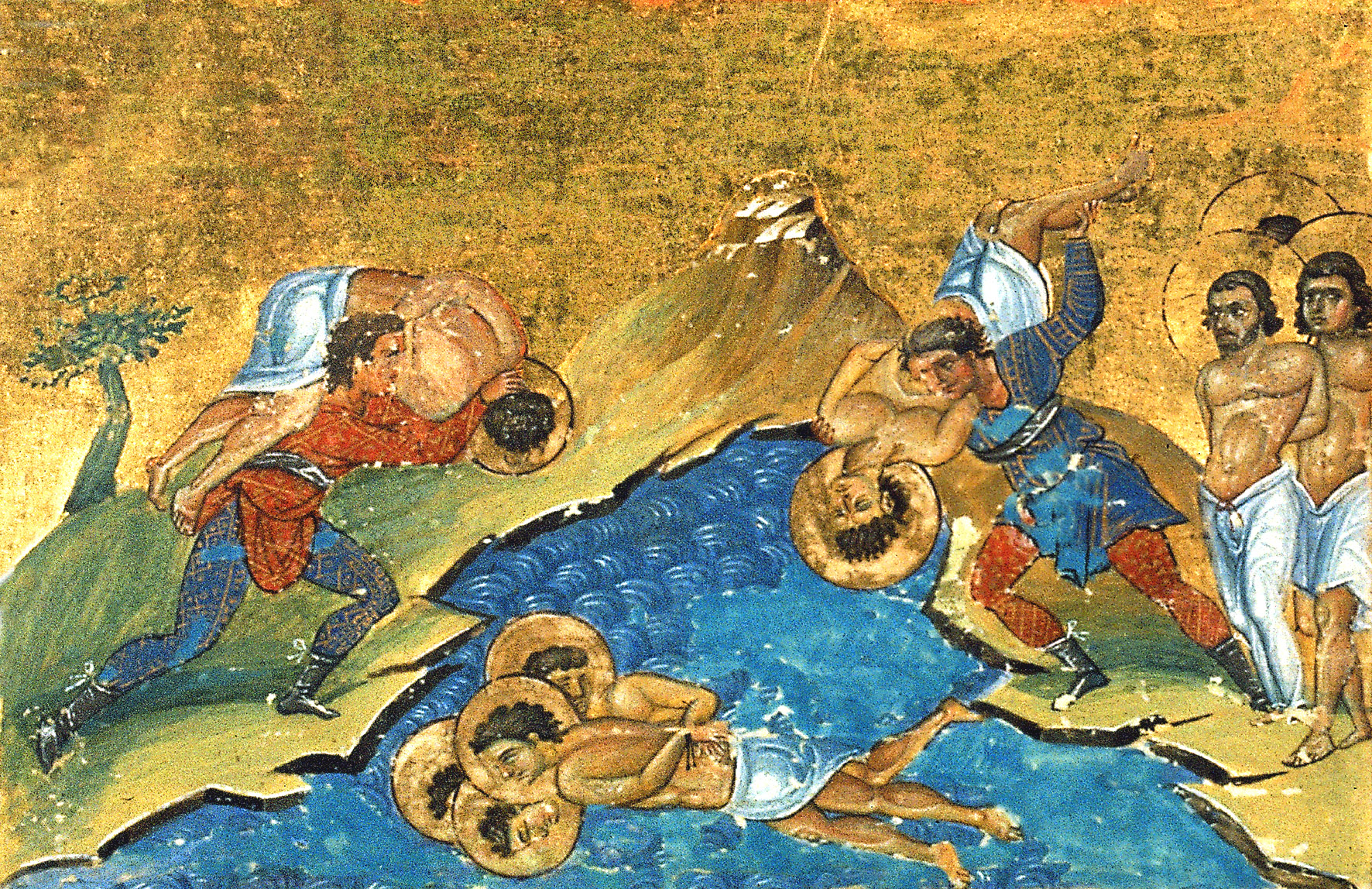
Miniature painting of the martyrdom of Ananias and his companions, Menologion of Basil II

- Ananias "of Phoenicia" the Presbyter, Peter the prison guard, and seven soldiers, get martyred in the form of drowning after lengthy torture for their Christianity, 295 AD, Phoenicia.
- Gelasinus is martyred in Baalbek, 297 AD.

== Ecclesiastical administration ==
The ecclesiastical administration of Pheonice paralleled the political, but with some differences. The bishop of Tyre emerged as the pre-eminent prelate of Phoenice by the mid-3rd century.

== Culture ==
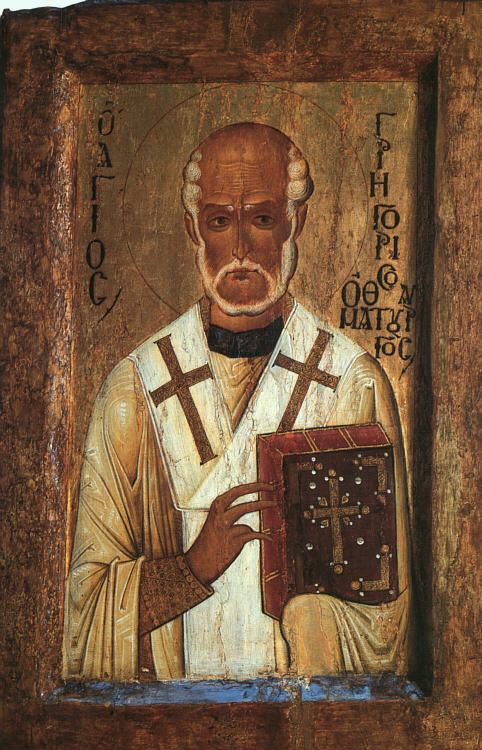
Saint Gregory the Miracle-Worker, 14th century icon

In 238 or 239 AD, Beirut was first mentioned in writing as a major center for the study of law in the panegyric of Gregory Thaumaturgus, the bishop of Neo-Caesarea The 3rd-century emperors Diocletian and Maximian issued constitutions exempting the students of the law school of Beirut from compulsory service in their hometowns.

== People ==
=== 200s ===
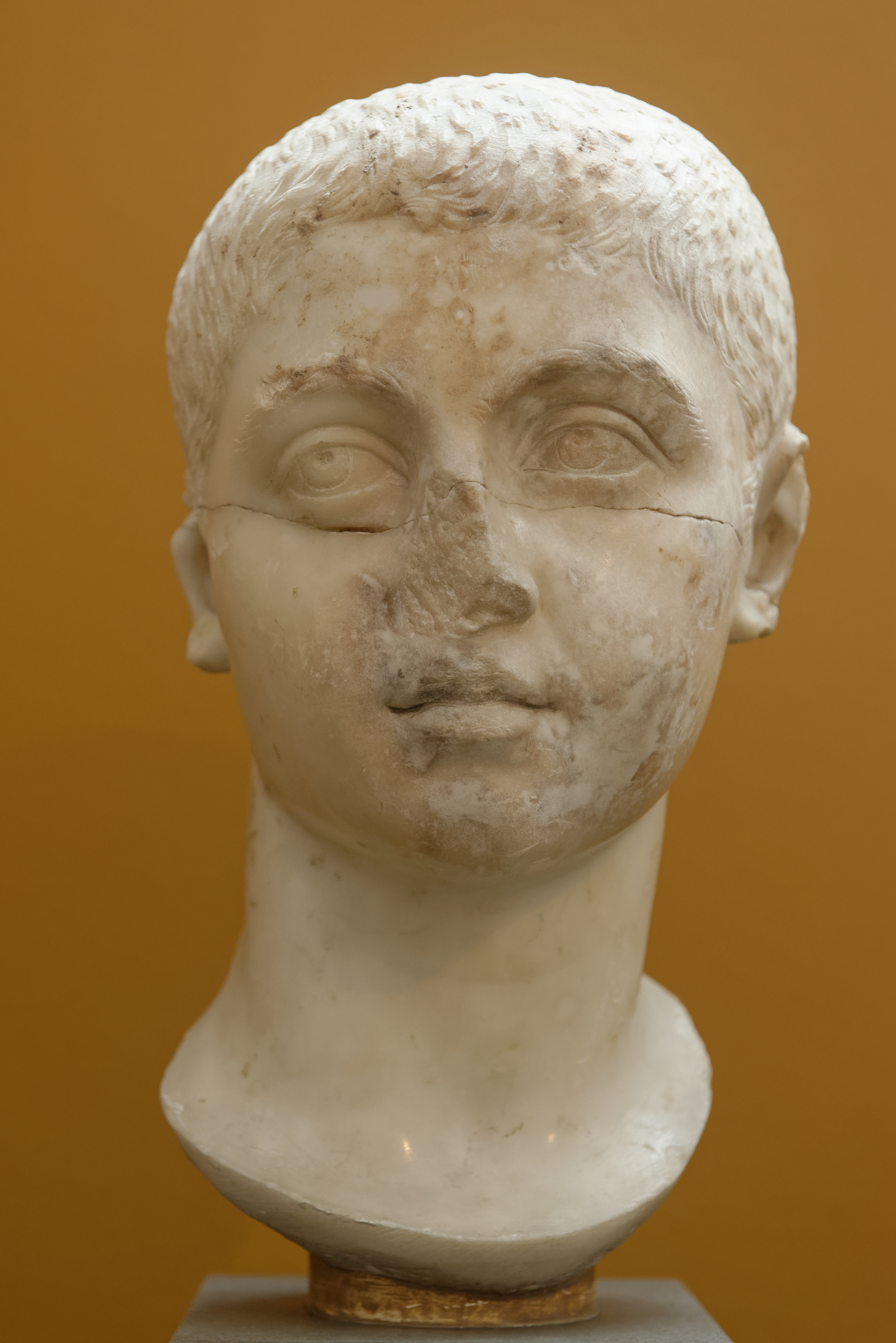
Bust of young Severus Alexander, Ny Carlsberg Glyptotek, Copenhagen

- Roman Emperor Marcus Aurelius Severus Alexander, known simply as Severus Alexander, is born in 1 October 208, Arqa, in modern-day Lebanon.

=== 230s ===
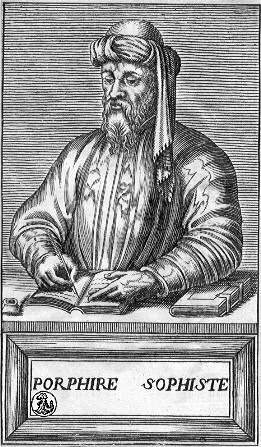
Porphire Sophiste, in a French 16th-century engraving

- Porphyry of Tyre, a Neoplatonic philosopher, is born in Tyre, c. 234 AD.

=== 250s ===
- Origen, an early Christian scholar, ascetic and theologian, dies in Tyre, c. 253 AD (aged c. 69).

== See also ==
- Palmyrene empire
- Canalizations of Zenobia

== Sources ==
- A.R. Birley, Septimius Severus: The African Emperor, Routledge, 2002
- Paturel, Simone (2019-07-01), Baalbek-Heliopolis, the Bekaa, and Berytus from 100 BCE to 400 CE, BRILL, doi:10.1163/9789004400733, ISBN 978-90-04-40073-3
- Forster, Thomas Ignatius M. (1828), Circle of the Seasons, and Perpetual Key to the Calendar and Almanack; to which is added the Circle of the Hours, and the History of the Days of the Week; being a Compendious Illustration of the History, Antiquities, and Natural Phenomena, of Each Day of the Year, London: J. & C. Adlard for Thomas Hookham
- Butler, Alban (1799), The Lives of the Primitive Fathers, Martyrs, and other Principal Saints: Compiled from Original Monuments, and other Authentic Records: Illustrated with the Remarks of Judicious Modern Critics and Historians, 3rd ed., Vol. VIII, Edinburgh: J. Moir for J. P. Coghlan
- Jessup, Samuel (1881). "Ba'albek". In Wilson, Charles William (ed.). Picturesque Palestine, Sinai, and Egypt, Div. II. New York: D. Appleton & Co., illustrated by Henry Fenn & J.D. Woodward. pp. 453–476.
- Collinet, Paul (1925). Histoire de l'école de droit de Beyrouth (in French). Paris: Société Anonyme du Recueil Sirey.
- Jidejian, Nina (1973). Beirut: Through the Ages. Beirut: Dar el-Machreq.
- Thaumaturgus, Gregory (1873) [239]. "Oratio Panegyrica ad Originem" [The Oration and Panegyric Addressed to Origen] (PDF). In Philip Schaff (ed.). Ante-Nicene Fathers. Vol. 6. Translated by S. D. F. Salmond. Edinburgh: Christian Classics Etheral Library.
- Yammine, Fr. Youssef, Daleel Ehden, Editor El, 2000.
- Sartre, Maurice (2005). The Middle East Under Rome. Cambridge, Mass.: Harvard University Press. ISBN 978-0-674-01683-5.
- Eißfeldt, Otto (1941). "Phoiniker (Phoinike)". Realencyclopädie der Classischen Altertumswissenschaft. Vol. Band XX, Halbband 39, Philon–Pignus. pp. 350–379.
- Martindale, J. R.; Jones, A. H. M, The Prosopography of the Later Roman Empire, Vol. I AD 260–395, Cambridge University Press (1971)
- Linda Jones Hall, Roman Berytus: Beirut in late antiquity (2004)
