= Outline of Lebanon =

Country in West Asia

The Flag of Lebanon

The location of Lebanon

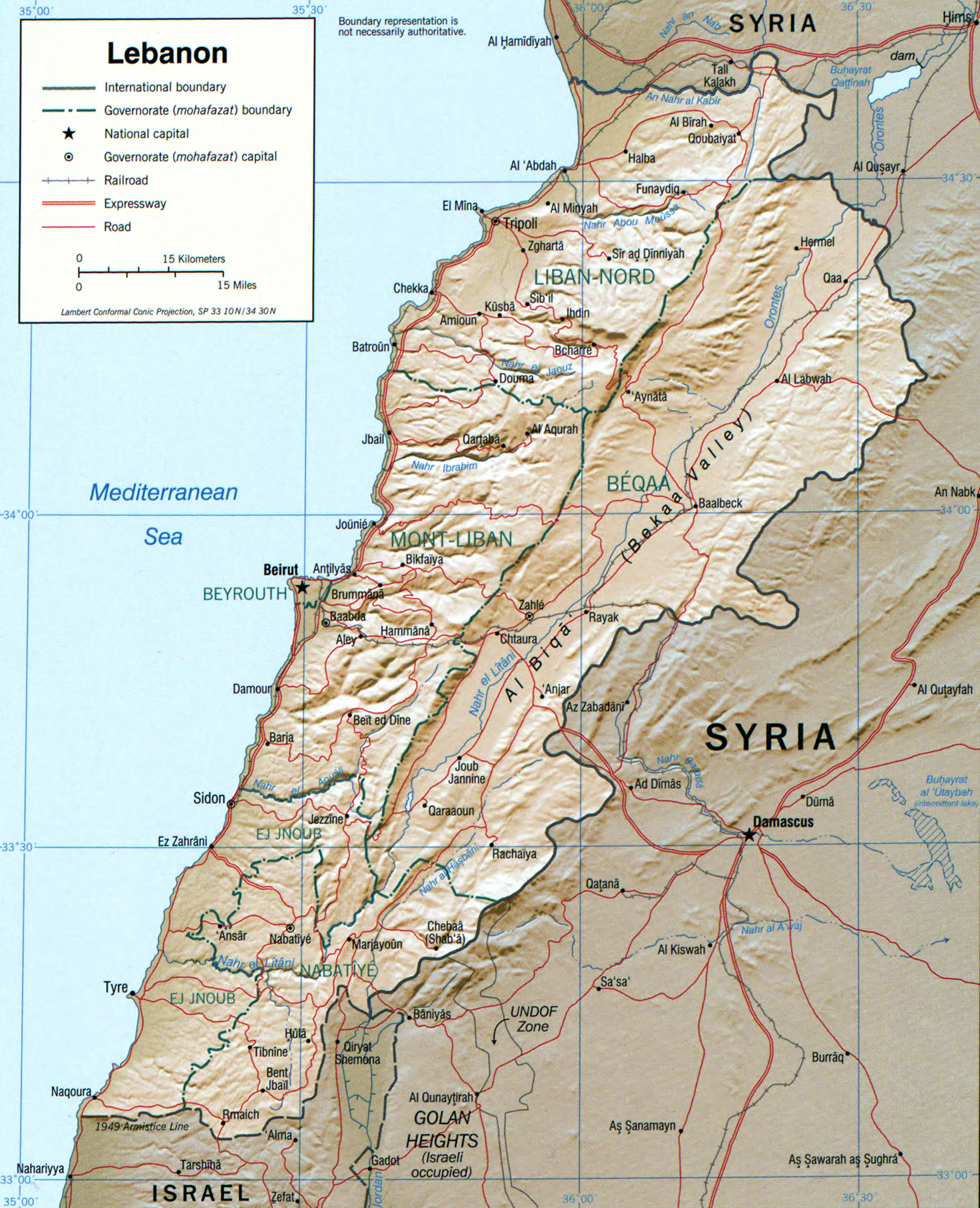
An enlargeable relief map of the Lebanese Republic

The following outline is provided as an overview of and topical guide to Lebanon:

Lebanon – sovereign country located along the eastern edge of the Mediterranean Sea in West Asia and the Middle East. Lebanon, due to its tense sectarian diversity, has a unique political system, known as confessionalism, in which each religious group is allocated a fixed number of seats in parliament. The country enjoyed a period of relative calm and prosperity before the devastating Lebanese Civil War from 1975 to 1990. In 2005, a wave of demonstrations known as the Cedar Revolution ended the 30-year Syrian occupation of Lebanon. By early 2006, a considerable degree of stability had been achieved throughout much of the country and Beirut's reconstruction was almost complete, but a debilitating 2006 war and internal strife caused significant economic damage and loss of life. Since 2019, Lebanon has faced a serious financial and economic crisis as well as political instability and social unrest, exacerbated by the 2020 Beirut explosion.

== General reference ==
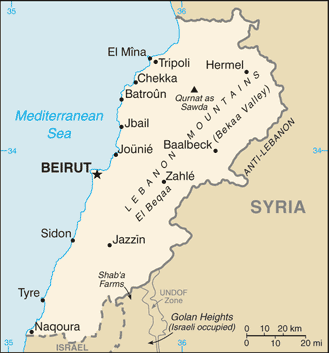
An enlargeable basic map of Lebanon

- Pronunciation: /lɛbənən/
- Common English country name: Lebanon
- Official English country name: The Lebanese Republic or the Republic of Lebanon
- Common endonym(s):
- Official endonym(s):
- Adjectival: Lebanese
- Demonym: Lebanese
- Etymology: Name of Lebanon
- International rankings of Lebanon
- ISO country codes: LB, LBN, 422
- ISO region codes: See ISO 3166-2:LB
- Internet country code top-level domain: .lb

== Geography of Lebanon ==
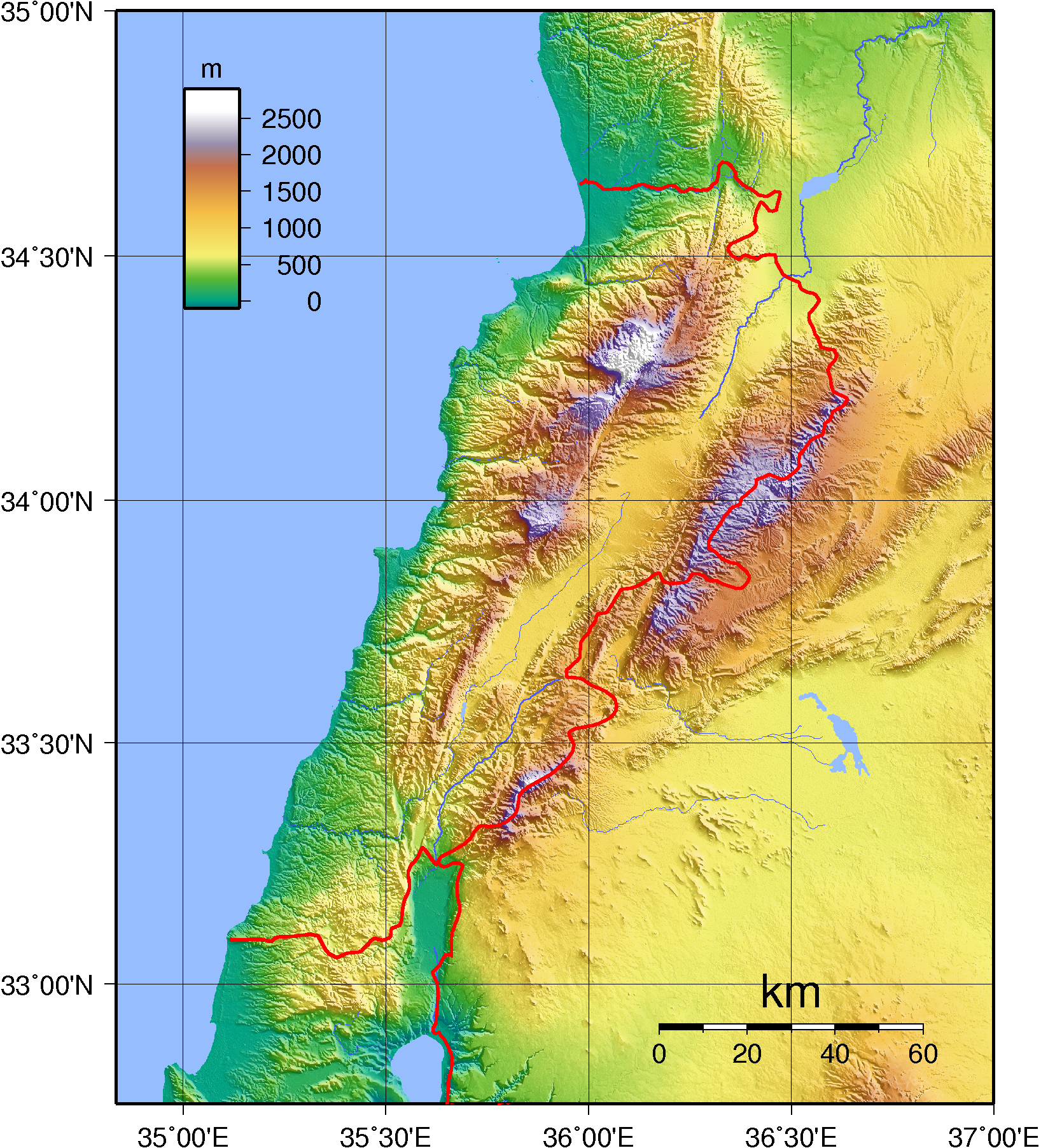
An enlargeable topographic map of Lebanon

Geography of Lebanon

- Lebanon is a country
- Location
  - Northern Hemisphere and Eastern Hemisphere
  - Eurasia
    - Asia
      - Southwest Asia
        - Eastern shore of the Mediterranean Sea
  - Middle East
    - The Levant
  - Time zone: Eastern European Time (UTC+02), Eastern European Summer Time (UTC+03)
  - Extreme points of Lebanon
    - High: Qurnat as Sawda' 3,088 m (10,131 ft)
    - Low: Mediterranean Sea 0 m
  - Land boundaries: 454 km

Syria 375 km
Israel 79 km

- Coastline: Mediterranean Sea 225 km

- Population of Lebanon: 6,824,986 - 106th most populous country
- Area of Lebanon: 10,452 km^{2}
- Atlas of Lebanon

=== Environment of Lebanon ===
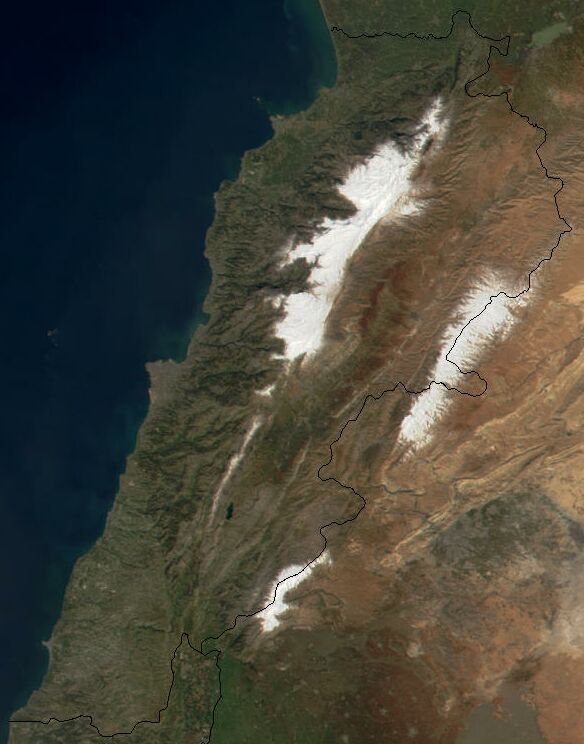
An enlargeable satellite image of Lebanon

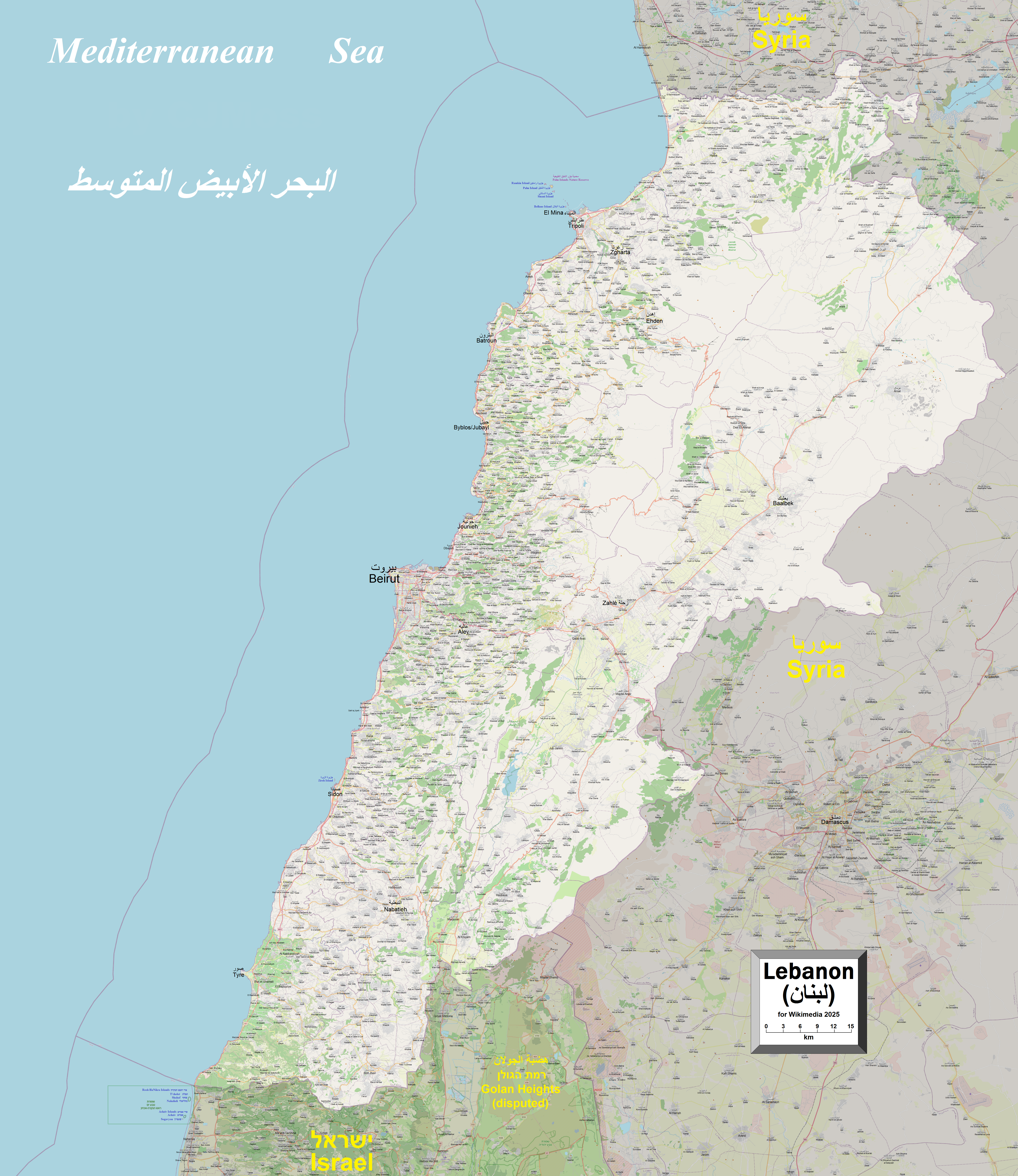
Detailed map of Lebanon with places marked in both Arabic and Latin script

- Climate of Lebanon
- Renewable energy in Lebanon
- Geology of Lebanon
- Protected areas of Lebanon
  - Biosphere reserves in Lebanon
  - National parks of Lebanon
- Wildlife of Lebanon
  - Fauna of Lebanon
    - Birds of Lebanon
    - Mammals of Lebanon

==== Natural geographic features of Lebanon ====
- Glaciers of Lebanon
- Islands of Lebanon
- Lakes of Lebanon
- Mountains of Lebanon
  - Volcanoes in Lebanon
- Rivers of Lebanon
  - Waterfalls of Lebanon
- Valleys of Lebanon
- List of World Heritage Sites in Lebanon

=== Regions of Lebanon ===
Regions of Lebanon

==== Ecoregions of Lebanon ====
List of ecoregions in Lebanon

- Ecoregions in Lebanon

==== Administrative divisions of Lebanon ====
Administrative divisions of Lebanon

- Governorates of Lebanon
  - Districts of Lebanon
    - Municipalities of Lebanon

===== Governorates of Lebanon =====
- Governorates of Lebanon
  - Akkar
  - Baalbek-Hermel
  - Beirut
  - Beqaa
  - Mount Lebanon
  - Nabatieh
  - North
  - South

===== Districts of Lebanon =====
Districts of Lebanon

===== Municipalities of Lebanon =====
Municipalities of Lebanon

- Capital of Lebanon: Beirut
- Cities of Lebanon

=== Demography of Lebanon ===
- Demographics of Lebanon
  - Religion in Lebanon
    - Christianity in Lebanon
      - Lebanese Maronite Christians
      - Lebanese Greek Orthodox Christians
      - Lebanese Melkite Christians
      - Lebanese Protestant Christians
        - Lebanese Baptists
      - Armenian Apostolic Christians
      - Armenian Catholics
      - Minorities (Lebanon)
    - Islam in Lebanon
      - Lebanese Shia Muslims
      - Lebanese Sunni Muslims
      - Alawites in Lebanon
    - Lebanese Druze
    - Judaism in Lebanon
  - Ethnic groups
    - Syrians in Lebanon
    - Palestinians in Lebanon
    - Armenians in Lebanon
    - Iraqis in Lebanon
    - Kurds in Lebanon
    - Turks in Lebanon
    - Assyrians in Lebanon
    - Circassians in Lebanon
    - French people in Lebanon
    - Italians in Lebanon
- Handicapped in Lebanon
  - Lebanese Physically Handicapped Union

=== Neighbors of Lebanon ===
- Syria - to the north and east
- Region of Palestine (Israel) - to the south

== Government and politics of Lebanon ==
Politics of Lebanon

- Form of government:
- Capital of Lebanon: Beirut
- Elections in Lebanon
  - 2005 Lebanese general election
  - 2009 Lebanese general election
- Political parties in Lebanon

=== Branches of the government of Lebanon ===
- Government of Lebanon

==== Executive branch of the government of Lebanon ====
- Head of state: President of Lebanon, Joseph Aoun
- Head of government: Prime Minister of Lebanon, Najib Mikati
- Parliament of Lebanon: Headed by Speaker Nabih Berri

==== Legislative branch of the government of Lebanon ====
- Parliament of Lebanon: Chamber of Deputies (unicameral)

==== Judicial branch of the government of Lebanon ====
- Court system of Lebanon

=== Foreign relations of Lebanon ===
Foreign relations of Lebanon

- Diplomatic missions in Lebanon
- Diplomatic missions of Lebanon

==== International organization membership ====
The Lebanese Republic is a member of:

- Arab Bank for Economic Development in Africa (ABEDA)
- Arab Fund for Economic and Development (AFESD)
- Arab Monetary Fund (AMF)
- Food and Agriculture Organization (FAO)
- Group of 24 (G24)
- Group of 77 (G77)
- International Atomic Energy Agency (IAEA)
- International Bank for Reconstruction and Development (IBRD)
- International Chamber of Commerce (ICC)
- International Civil Aviation Organization (ICAO)
- International Criminal Police Organization (Interpol)
- International Development Association (IDA)
- International Federation of Red Cross and Red Crescent Societies (IFRCS)
- International Finance Corporation (IFC)
- International Fund for Agricultural Development (IFAD)
- International Labour Organization (ILO)
- International Maritime Organization (IMO)
- International Mobile Satellite Organization (IMSO)
- International Monetary Fund (IMF)
- International Olympic Committee (IOC)
- International Organization for Standardization (ISO)
- International Red Cross and Red Crescent Movement (ICRM)
- International Telecommunication Union (ITU)
- International Telecommunications Satellite Organization (ITSO)
- Inter-Parliamentary Union (IPU)
- Islamic Development Bank (IDB)
- League of Arab States (LAS)
- Multilateral Investment Guarantee Agency (MIGA)
- Nonaligned Movement (NAM)
- Organisation internationale de la Francophonie (OIF)
- Organisation of Islamic Cooperation (OIC)
- Organization of American States (OAS) (observer)
- Permanent Court of Arbitration (PCA)
- United Nations (UN)
- United Nations Conference on Trade and Development (UNCTAD)
- United Nations Educational, Scientific, and Cultural Organization (UNESCO)
- United Nations High Commissioner for Refugees (UNHCR)
- United Nations Industrial Development Organization (UNIDO)
- United Nations Relief and Works Agency for Palestine Refugees in the Near East (UNRWA)
- Universal Postal Union (UPU)
- World Customs Organization (WCO)
- World Federation of Trade Unions (WFTU)
- World Health Organization (WHO)
- World Intellectual Property Organization (WIPO)
- World Meteorological Organization (WMO)
- World Tourism Organization (UNWTO)
- World Trade Organization (WTO) (observer)

=== Law and order in Lebanon ===
Law of Lebanon

- Constitution of Lebanon
- Crime in Lebanon
- Human rights in Lebanon
  - LGBT rights in Lebanon
  - Freedom of religion in Lebanon
- Law enforcement in Lebanon

=== Military of Lebanon ===
Military of Lebanon

- Command
  - Commander-in-chief: Joseph Aoun
    - Ministry of National Defense
- Forces
  - Army of Lebanon
  - Navy of Lebanon
  - Air Force of Lebanon
  - Special forces of Lebanon
- Military history of Lebanon
  - Wars involving the Lebanon
- Military ranks of Lebanon

=== Local government in Lebanon ===
Local government in Lebanon

== History of Lebanon ==
- Economic history of Lebanon
- Military history of Lebanon
- History of Lebanon
- History of ancient Lebanon
  - Prehistory of Lebanon

== Culture of Lebanon ==
Culture of Lebanon

- Architecture of Lebanon
- Cuisine of Lebanon
- Ethnic minorities in Lebanon
- Festivals in Lebanon
- Languages of Lebanon
- Lebanese society
- Media in Lebanon
- Museums in Lebanon
- National symbols of Lebanon
  - Coat of arms of Lebanon
  - Flag of Lebanon
  - National anthem of Lebanon
- People of Lebanon
- Prostitution in Lebanon
- Public holidays in Lebanon
- Records of Lebanon
- Religion in Lebanon
  - Armenians in Lebanon
  - Buddhism in Lebanon
  - Christianity in Lebanon
  - Druze in Lebanon
  - Hinduism in Lebanon
  - Islam in Lebanon
  - Judaism in Lebanon
  - Sikhism in Lebanon
- List of World Heritage Sites in Lebanon

=== Art in Lebanon ===
- Art in Lebanon
- Cinema of Lebanon
- Literature of Lebanon
- Music of Lebanon
- Television in Lebanon
- Theatre in Lebanon

=== Sports in Lebanon ===
Sports in Lebanon

- Football in Lebanon
- Lebanon at the Olympics
- Basketball in Lebanon
- Skiing in Lebanon
  - Ski resorts
- Lebanon Mountain Trail

== Economy and infrastructure of Lebanon ==
Economy of Lebanon

- Economic rank, by nominal GDP (2007): 85th (eighty-fifth)
- Agriculture in Lebanon
- Banking in Lebanon
  - Central bank of Lebanon: Banque du Liban
- Communications in Lebanon
  - Internet in Lebanon
- Companies of Lebanon
- Currency of Lebanon: Pound
  - ISO 4217: LBP
- Economic history of Lebanon
- Energy in Lebanon
  - Energy policy of Lebanon
  - Oil industry in Lebanon
- Health care in Lebanon
- Mining in Lebanon
- National Stock Exchange of Lebanon: Beirut Stock Exchange
- Tourism in Lebanon
- Transport in Lebanon
  - Airports in Lebanon
  - Rail transport in Lebanon
  - Roads in Lebanon
- Water supply and sanitation in Lebanon

== Education in Lebanon ==
Education in Lebanon

Ministry of Education and Higher Education

== See also ==
- List of international rankings
- Member state of the United Nations
- Outline of Asia
- Outline of geography
