= Wildlife of Lebanon =

The wildlife of Lebanon refers to the flora and fauna of Lebanon, a country in Asia located at the eastern end of the Mediterranean Sea. The country has four main geographical areas: the coastal plain, Mount Lebanon, the Beqaa Valley and the Anti-Lebanon Mountains. The climate is Mediterranean, with the coastal regions experiencing hot, humid summers and cool, wet winters, and the elevated areas inland experiencing colder winters with snow that lingers on into the summer. The country offers a variety of habitats for wildlife, including mountains, valleys, marshes, coastal plains, salt marshes and sea coasts.

== Geography ==
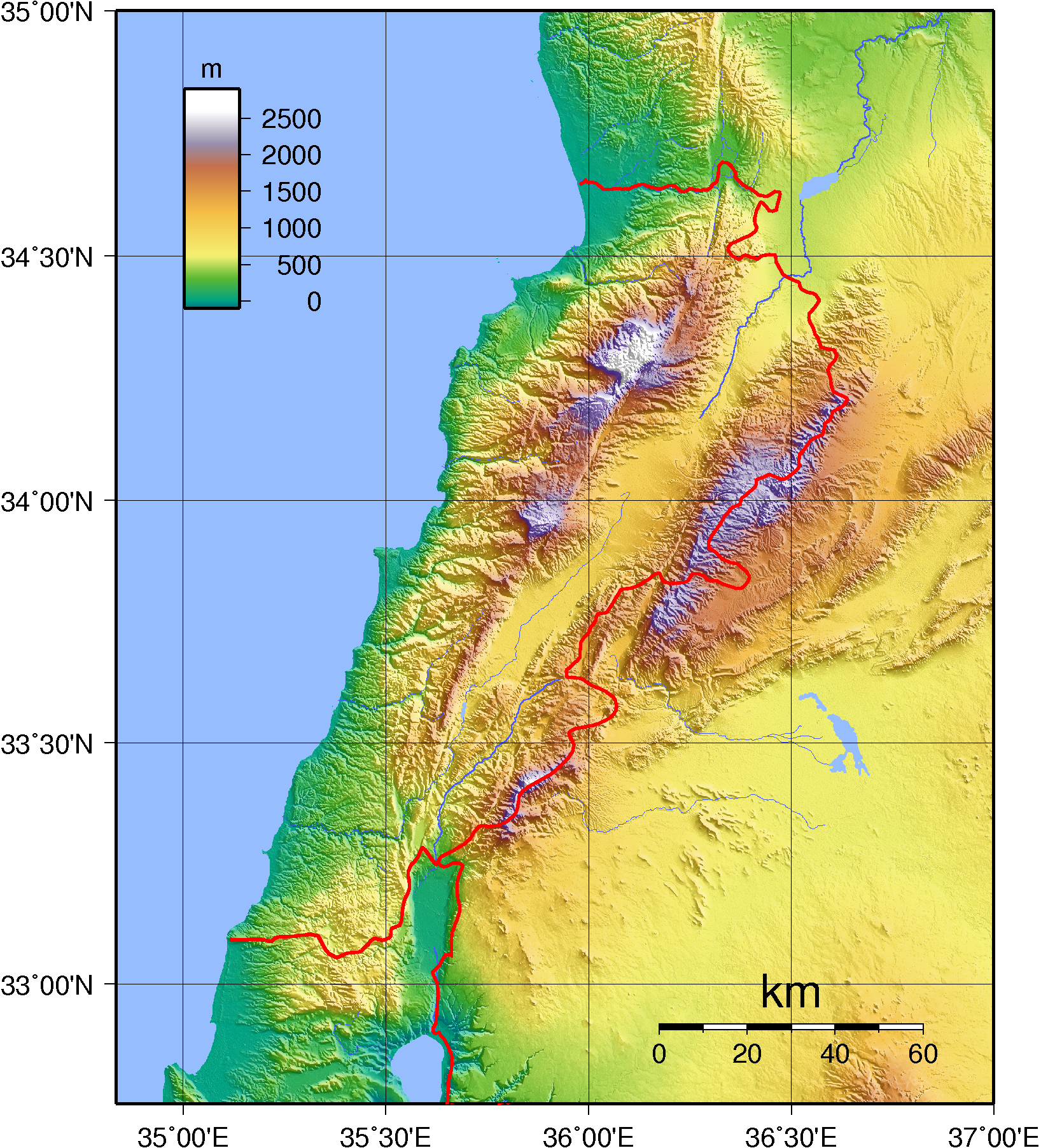
Topographical map of Lebanon

The coastal strip is relatively narrow and is a fertile area cropped intensively. Inland from this the foothills of Mount Lebanon rise steeply. The mountain range runs parallel with the coast and is about 170 km (110 mi) long and 56 km (30 mi) wide at its broadest point, and over 3,000 m (9,800 ft) at its highest point. This range is divided from the Anti-Lebanon Mountains by the Beqaa Valley, which is part of the Great Rift Valley system. Two rivers originate in this valley, which is about 16 km (10 mi) wide; the Orontes River flows northwards into Syria while the Litani River flows southwards and westwards before entering the Mediterranean Sea. This fertile area has vineyards and grows cereals, vegetables and fruit. To the east of the Beqaa Valley, the Anti-Lebanon Mountains are orientated in a southwest–northeast direction and the crest of the range forms the border between Lebanon and Syria. The summits here are slightly lower than Mount Lebanon, the daily temperature variations are greater and the winters are colder.

The Mediterranean coast extends for about 225 km (140 mi). The coastal plain covers about sixteen percent of the land area of Lebanon but is inhabited by three quarters of the population. The coast itself is mostly flat with sandy bays and salt-marshes and a few rocky capes, but lack of urban planning means that much of the coastline has seen indiscriminate development, with deposit of materials for land reclamation and highway construction. Pollution also poses a problem for the coastal wildlife.

== Flora ==
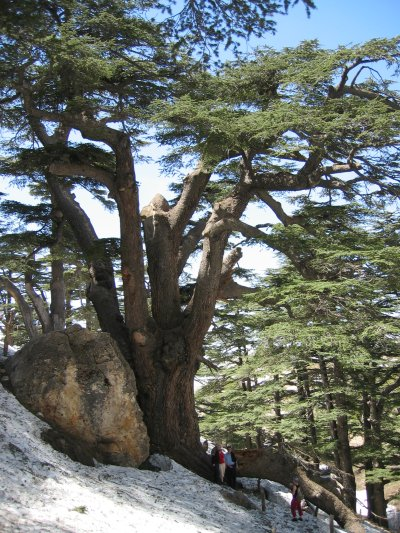
Cedar of Lebanon

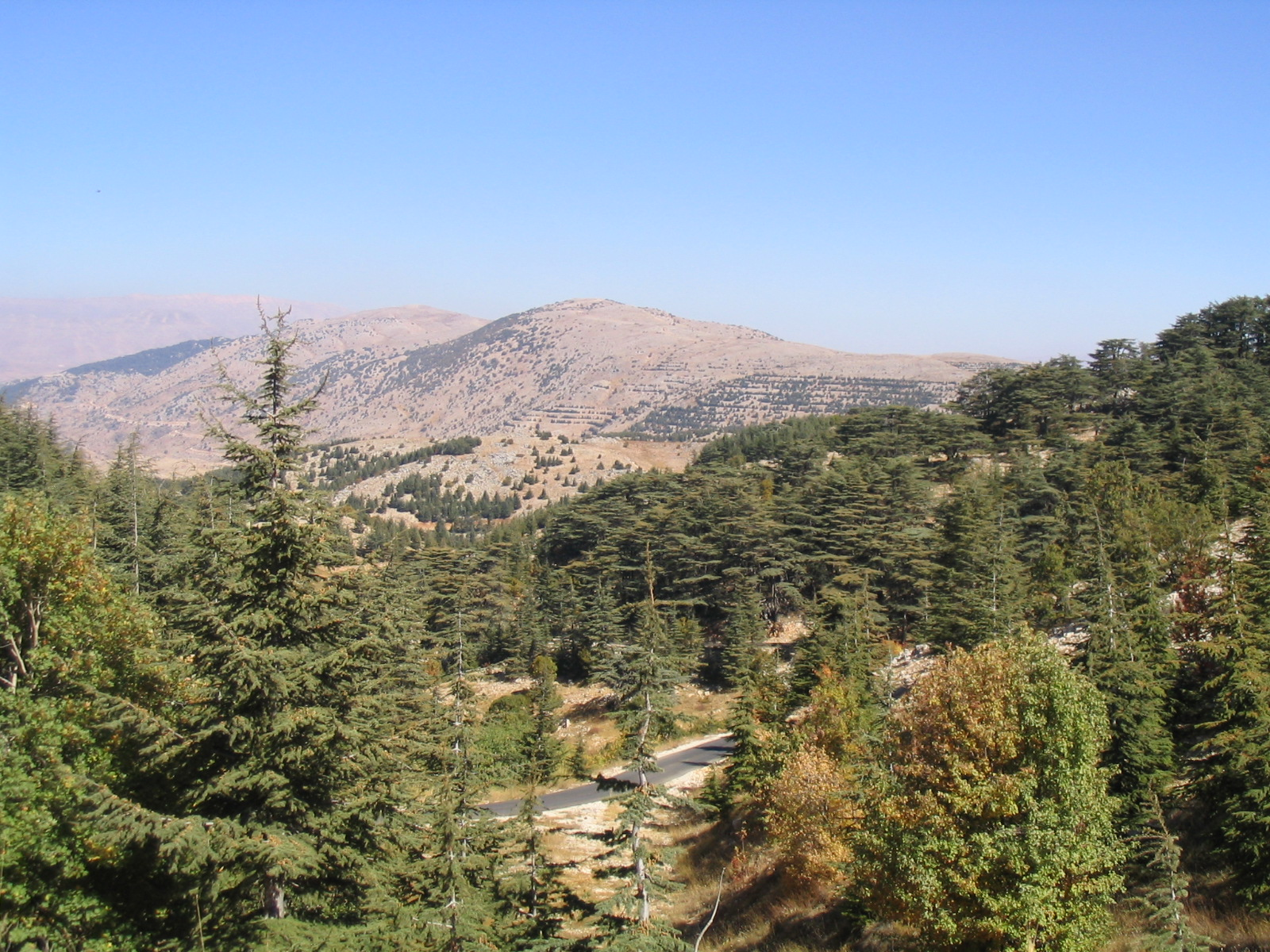
Al Chouf Cedar Nature Reserve

The natural vegetation of Lebanon has been threatened by overexploitation and fragmentation as a result of urban expansion, overgrazing, tourism, and warfare. The cedar of Lebanon is the national symbol of the country. Growing in the Lebanon Mountain range, these trees have been heavily harvested over the years for their valuable timber and few mature trees still remain Cedars are quite common in the mountainous forests and villages of Lebanon. Many reserves have thousands planted. Nevertheless, Lebanon is more heavily wooded than most other countries in the region, and pine, oak, fir, beech, cypress and juniper are to be found in the mountain areas although the Beqaa valley has little tree cover. Where timber has been extracted and woodland destroyed, scrub has taken over; in the Lebanon Mountain area this is mostly Ceratonia, oak and Pistacia, and in the Anti-Lebanon range the scrub is mostly Pistacia and wild almond. Other native trees such as the Lebanese wild apple, Judas tree and Syrian maple are being grown experimentally as a conservation strategy to see if they are amenable to container production.

The Al Shouf Cedar Nature Reserve was established in 1996 to preserve an old stand of cedar in central Lebanon. It covers 550 km^{2} (212 mi^{2}), which is 5.3% of the country's total area, and includes 620 hectares (1,500 acres) of cedar forest which, with the exclusion of livestock is successfully regenerating. There are 24 kinds of tree in the reserve and 436 species of plant, including about 48 which are endemic to Lebanon, Syria and Turkey. There are some wolves, and other large mammals in this reserve as well. There are mammals outside of reserves, but they aren't safe, hunting for rats, rabbits, and garbage next to villages.

With the reduction in tree cover comes an increase in soil erosion and the government has initiated a tree planting program to try to reduce environmental damage and large numbers of trees, including cedars, oaks, maples and junipers have been planted. The Lebanon Reforestation Initiative is an international program set up by the United States Forest Service with funding provided by the United States Agency for International Development in 2014.

Apart from trees, there are a large number of flowering plants, ferns and mosses in the country. Many of the plants bloom after the winter rains, and the annual plants germinate at this time, grow, flower and set seed while the soil is moist enough to support them. One plant endemic to the country is the endangered Lebanon violet, found high up in rocky shrubland on the west side of Mount Lebanon.

== Fauna ==
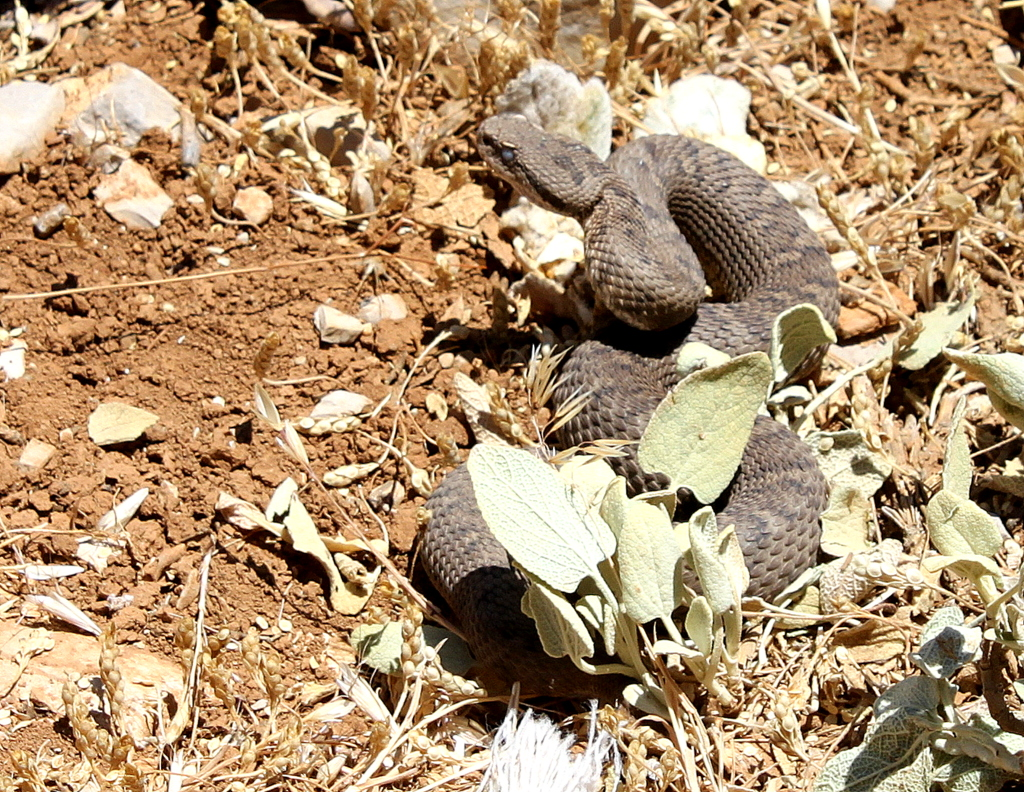
Lebanon viper

The Middle East blind mole-rat and Günther's vole are found in cultivated fields and are regarded as pests. The rock hyrax is found in rocky habitats in high mountains. Few species of large mammals are to be found in Lebanon because of hunting pressure, overgrazing by domestic livestock and the increasing amounts of intensively cultivated land.

Grazing animals include the Nubian ibex, and the roe deer.

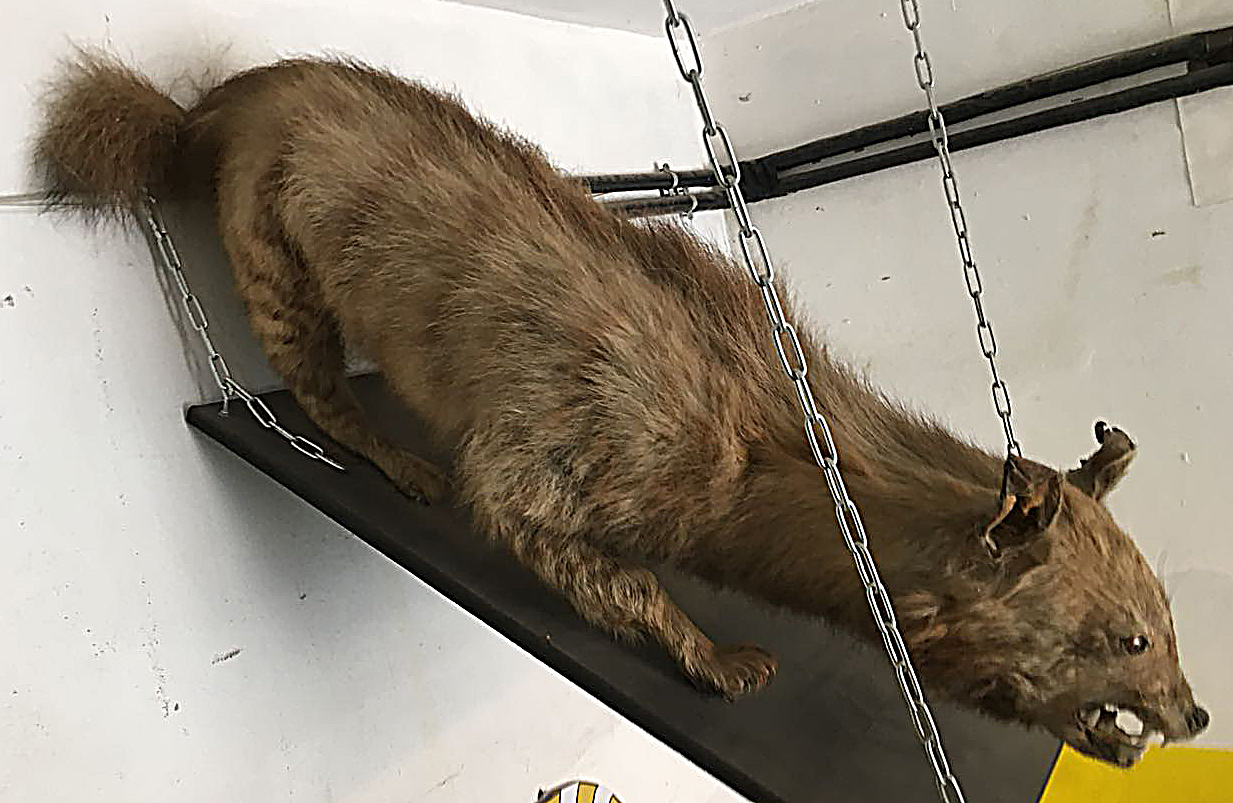
A stuffed trophy of a Lebanese striped hyena displayed in the shop of a local hunter residing near the Kadisha Valley, Lebanon.

As for large predators, the gray wolf can be found in El Shouf Biosphere Reserve, Natural Reserves around Lebanon, and other forests in Lebanon. The striped hyena is Lebanon's national animal and is seldom seen, coming out only at night. They are extinct in some areas, but some thrive and steal livestock and garbage in villages. Others hunt for rabbits, squirrels, rats, mice, and rarely deer or goats. They are extremely shy, and allegedly will not approach any human. However, as recently as 2018 there are confirmed sightings by residents of the Kadisha Valley region, with local hunters claiming they have shot and killed striped hyenas. The red fox is also quite common, living in all regions, and eating mostly rodents, livestock, and garbage. The Syrian brown bear is considered extinct in Lebanon having been extirpated in the early twentieth century. In December 2016, there was a single sighting of a bear wandering in the snow near the Syrian border, which was recorded on video by an onlooker with a mobile phone. The government of Lebanon protected the area the bears were spotted in for extra privacy from humans. The mountain gazelle may still exist in remote areas of the south, and there are protected areas where it could be reintroduced.

The wild boar can be found in the Beqaa Region, in packs of 20 or so, running around, searching for food.

The golden jackal is relatively common in Lebanon, there are some next to villages in the forest and others in natural reserves.

The red fox is in similar position with the golden jackal.

Some of the larger mammals native to Lebanon include: wildcats, striped hyenas, jackals, Egyptian mongoose, least weasel, beech marten, European otter, Caucasian badger, honey badger, gray wolf, marbled polecat, jungle cat, caracal, red foxes, porcupines and squirrels. Syrian brown bear were formerly resident in the Lebanon and anti-Lebanon mountain ranges until the early twentieth century. Vagrant records of brown bears continued until the 1980s and single sighting was recorded in 2016.

Rodents in Lebanon include squirrel, porcupine, dormice, mice, rats, voles, mole rats, hamsters, jirds and jerboas. Also in the Beqaa Valley, Lake Yammoune is home to the country's only endemic fish, Pseudophoxinus libani. About 31 species of reptiles and amphibians are found in this region, including tortoises, chameleons, and various snakes, lizards, frogs and toads.

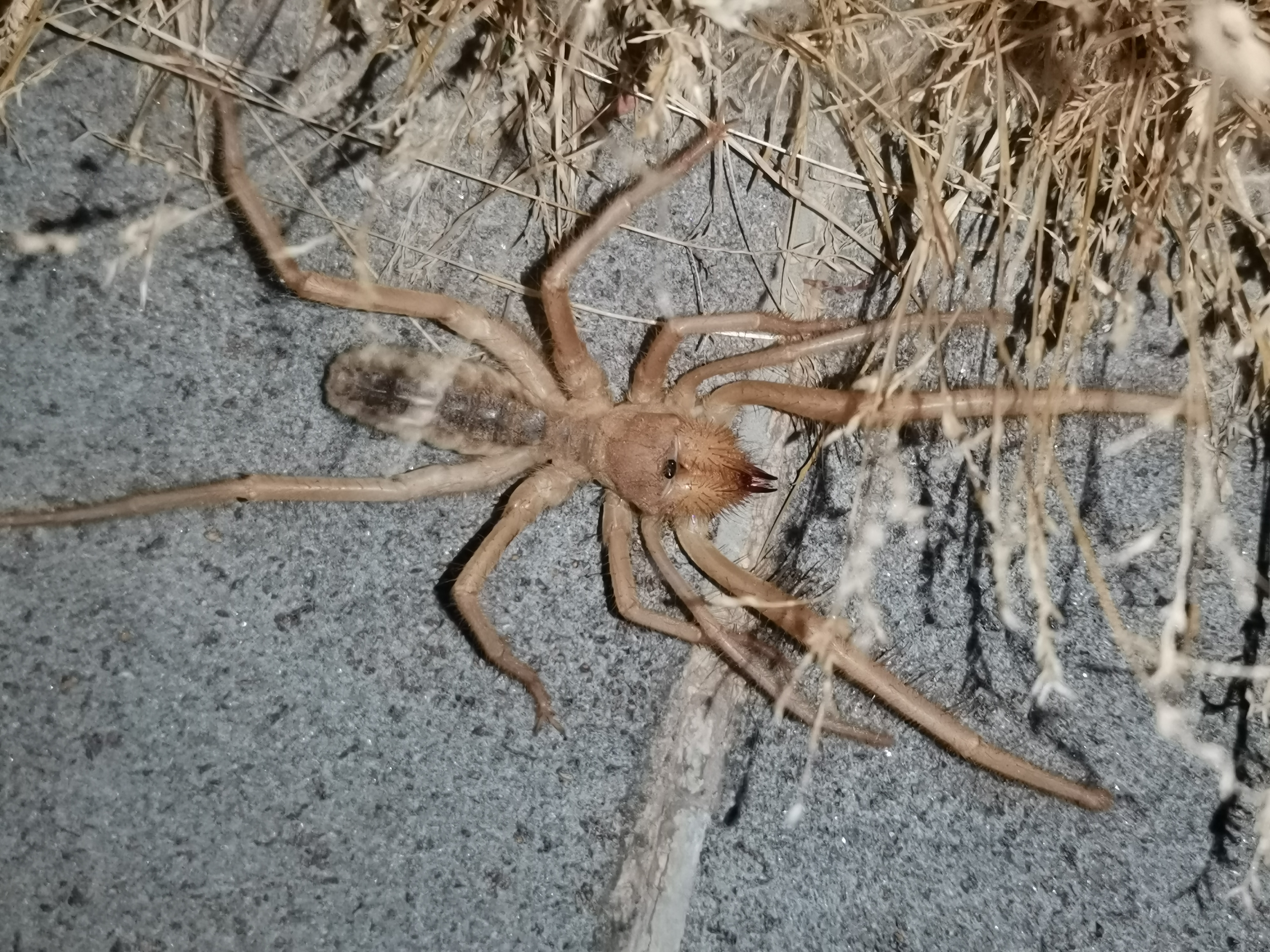
A sun spider - or wind scorpion - in Kfardebian.

A species of sun spider, which crawls while raising its front limbs, make its home in the arid higher altitudes.

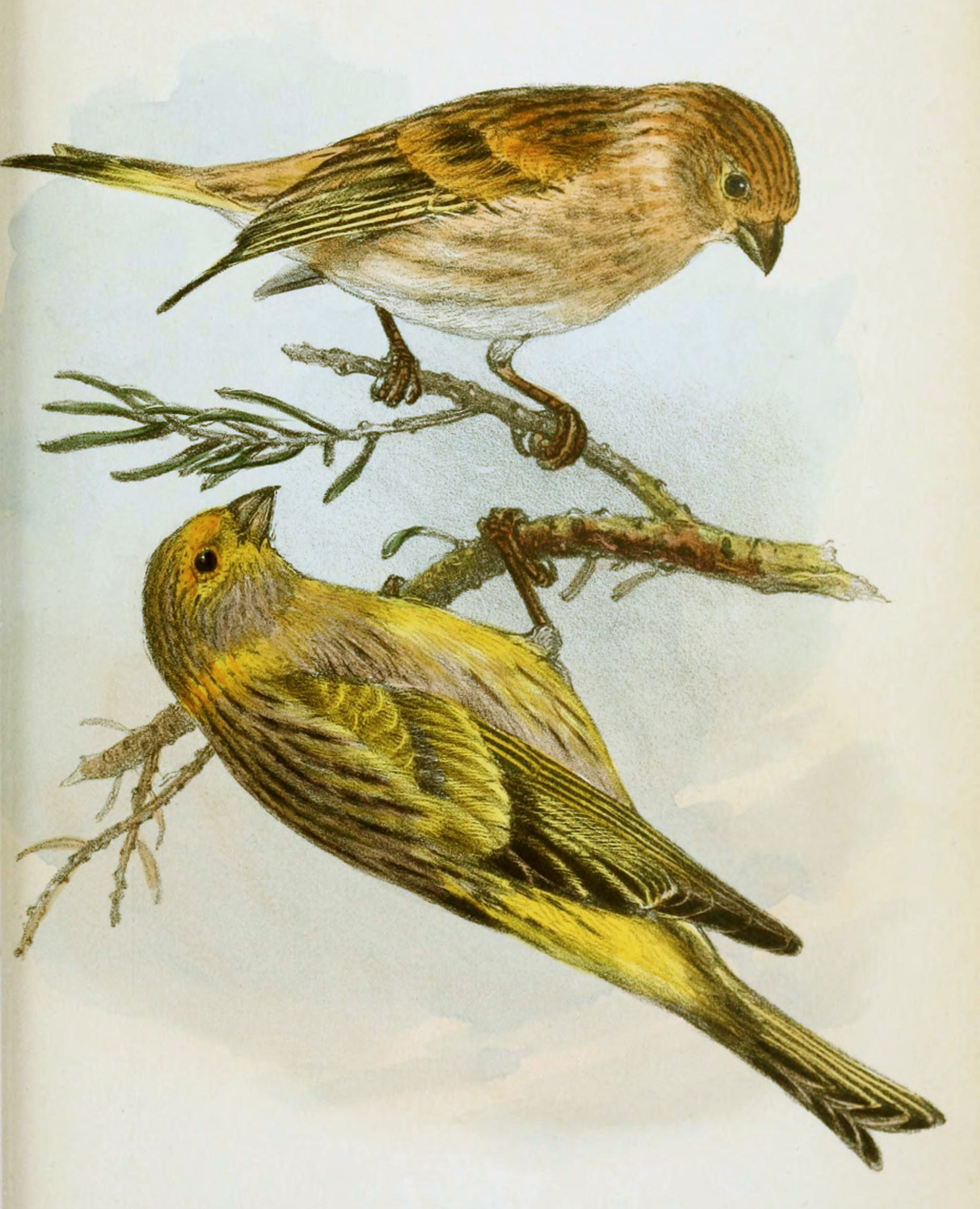
Syrian serin

The Aammiq Wetland is a biosphere reserve in the Beqaa Valley and is the largest wetland area in the country, covering an area of 250 hectares (620 acres) of marshes and lakes. It is an important site for migratory birds and over 250 species of bird have been recorded there including such rarities as the ferruginous duck, the great snipe, the lesser kestrel and the greater spotted eagle. In the nearby Shouf Mountains, there are such species as the endemic Syrian serin, the horned owl, the chukar partridge and the long-legged buzzard.

The Palm Islands Nature Reserve is a group of three small low, rocky islands located 5.5 kilometres (3.4 mi) offshore and the adjoining sea area. It has been designated an Important Bird Area by BirdLife International, as it is a stopping off point for migratory water birds. Among the 156 species recorded here are the ruff, grey heron, white wagtail and Audouin's gull. The beaches are used for breeding by the loggerhead and green sea turtle, and the endangered Mediterranean monk seal has been seen here.
