= Desertification in Lebanon =

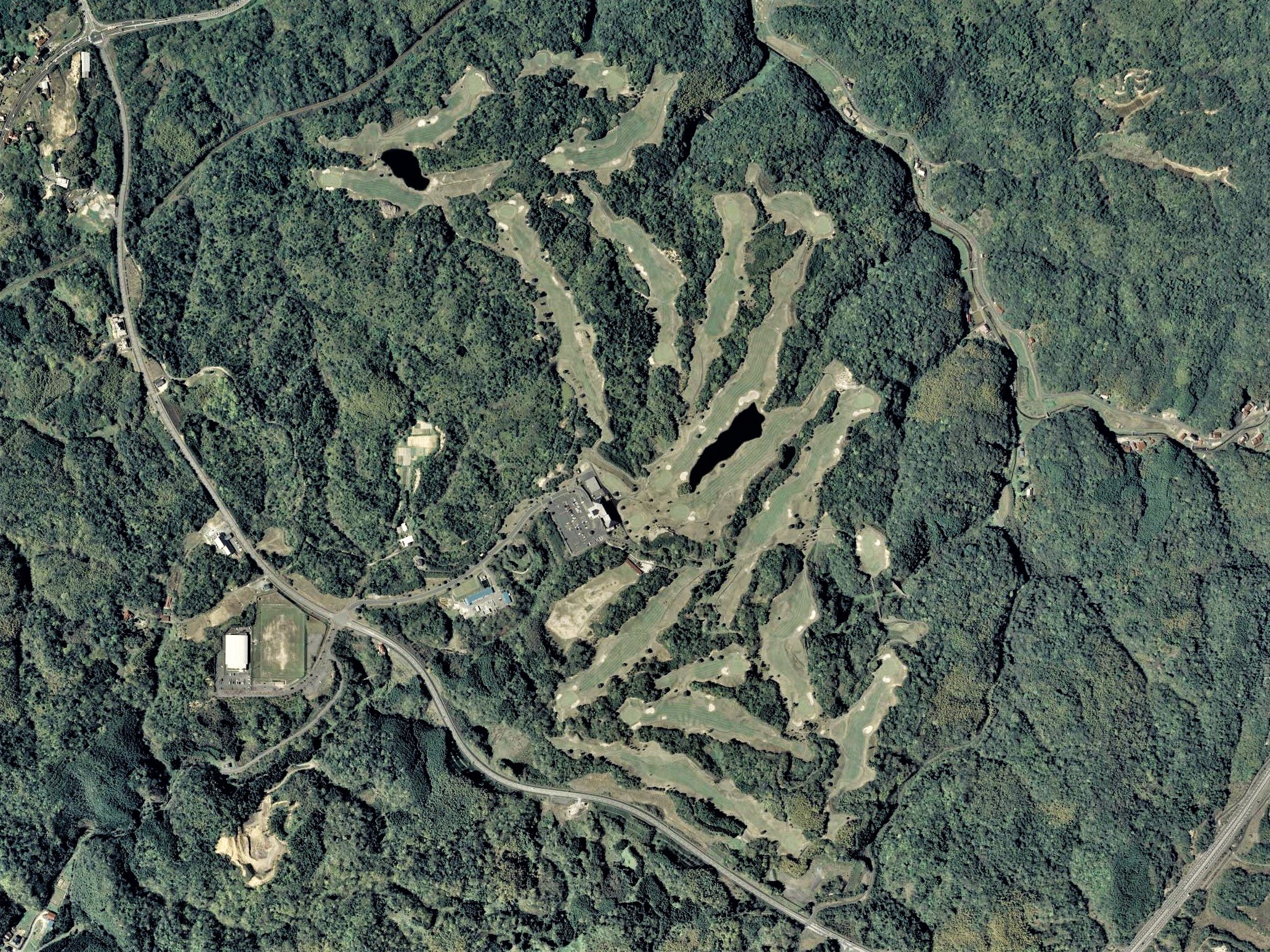
Hamada Golf Links, Hamada Shimane

According to a study done by the National Work to Fight Desertification program, over 60 percent of the land in Lebanon is at risk of desertification. According to The World Bank, the country's arable land, having reached 23.5% of the country's territory during the years 1971–1973, fell to 11.1% in 2010 and, as of 2021, had risen to just 13.6%. Lebanon's land desertification spreads 60 kilometers, beginning at the edge of the city Baalbek and continuing to its border with Syria. Most studies on desertification in Lebanon have concluded that the area of northern Bekaa is the region most affected by this environmental issue.

One of Lebanon's main causes of desertification is the development of cities on prime agricultural land. Forests were cleared and roads were built without any consideration of the impact it would have on the society and environment, which led to severe land degradation. Additionally, this area has suffered from a severe lack of rainfall. Northern Bekaa has had an annual average of 450 mm of rain in the past few years, and some areas in Hermel have had less than 150 mm (5.9 in). Although there have been ecotourism projects in Hermel that help raise awareness of the environment for the residents, most of the land has become unusable and projects to repair the land would leave a large bill for landowners.

== Agriculture ==
Desertification reduces natural food production, which makes the country turn to foreign imports of food. This foreign aid can lead to a lack of agriculture in the country, which makes it more costly to produce locally. Lebanon's agriculture is considered essential to the economy. Agriculture in Lebanon is a source of food as well as exports including fruits, vegetables, eggs, cereals, sugar, and livestock products.

According to the Food and Agriculture Organization of the United Nations, there was $280 million worth of financial consequences to the agricultural sector. This included crop production, fisheries, forestry, and livestock. Major problems facing agricultural production cause the rural people in Lebanon to live in poverty. These problems include the small size of agricultural holdings, lack of agriculture policies, high production costs, and lack of specialized agricultural credit. The agriculture sector in Lebanon accounts for 5% of the country’s GDP and employs about 8% of the labor force. About 70% of Lebanon’s food needs are satisfied by imports. Lebanon’s agriculture sector is underdeveloped and poorly managed, and only 55% of the productive areas are used, often inefficiently and wastefully. The agriculture sector also suffers from a lack of funding and receives less than 1% of the country’s budget. The total food imports for 2009 were estimated at US$2.216 billion, or 13% of the country’s total imports. The top 10 food imports into Lebanon are as follows:

Product	Volume – US$ million	Main Suppliers
1. Live bovine animals	200	Brazil/Uruguay
2. Cheese	117	Syria/Morocco
3. Meat	113	Brazil/Paraguay
4. Wheat	109	Russia/Ukraine
5. Sugar	83	Thailand/UAE
6. Maize (Corn)	75	United States/Ukraine
7. Food preparations	62	United States/United Kingdom
8. Milk powder	46	Netherlands/Denmark
9. Sheep (Live)	46	Australia/Turkey
10. Coffee	43	Brazil

== Economic impact ==
=== Poverty ===
With the growth of desertification in Lebanon comes the growth of poverty. Desertification is a large threat to economic activity in Lebanon, and about 35 percent of families in Lebanon live below the poverty line. Because of this, many families have moved from the country to the city. Most of these people are small farmers, wage laborers, fishers, livestock herders, and women who are heads of households. In 2006 poverty was the highest in North Lebanon (52.5%), then South Lebanon (42%), Bekaa (29%), Mount Lebanon (19.5%), and Nabatiyeh (19%). The North has 21% of Lebanon's population, but 46% of the extremely poor and 38% of the entire poor population. In Bekaa, Lebanon's region most affected by desertification, the local inhabitants average $50 a month.

=== Unemployment ===
Since Lebanon's civil war, the country has been facing a severe economic problem because of the destruction of Lebanese industries and infrastructure. The agriculture sector is also weak because most of the rural Lebanese citizens migrated to the city. Millions of foreign workers travel to Lebanon every year and offer their services at a lower price to compete with the Lebanese workers. The labor supply exceeds the demand because of this, causing higher unemployment rates. The Lebanese also find some jobs, such as agriculture, unattractive because of the poor wages.

== Combating desertification ==
The United Nations is working on combating desertification in Lebanon. They have set up Green Houses cooperatives nurseries to increase farmer productivity in the country. According to the United Nations Development Programme (UNDP), The cooperative association is trying to increase the interaction between different communities and develop a common source of livelihood between them that benefits farmers. Farmers can bring their seeds to the greenhouse where they are treated and grown in a healthy environment. When the farmers get their seeds back, the results are of very high quality, and these farmers can then sell these crops for a better price and increase production. This increase in production leads to an increase in income and employment which helps to improve Lebanon's economy.

To help raise awareness about the dangers of desertification as well as present their local project, Lebanon's Agricultural Ministry and its Combat Desertification Project unit, in collaboration with the UNDP, organized a trip to both villages in northeastern Bekaa. Since March 2004 the CDP has been running their first agro-tourism pilot project in the Deir al-Ahmar–Yammouneh area. The agro-tourism project has two objectives: generating additional income for the local communities and conserving the environment. It was established in cooperation with the hiking organization Esprit-Monade and the Women's Association of Deir al-Ahmar Agro-tourism farms in Lebanon offer tours to allow a person to view the growing, harvesting, and processing of Lebanon's locally grown foods. Farmers will often provide a homestay opportunity along with lessons in farming.
