= List of mammals of Lebanon =

This list of mammals of Lebanon comprises 107 mammal species recorded in Lebanon, of which one is critically endangered, two are endangered, seven are vulnerable, and one is near threatened.

The following tags are used to highlight each species' conservation status as assessed by the IUCN Red List:

EX	Extinct	No reasonable doubt that the last individual has died.
EW	Extinct in the wild	Known only to survive in captivity or as a naturalized populations well outside its previous range.
CR	Critically endangered	The species is in imminent risk of extinction in the wild.
EN	Endangered	The species is facing an extremely high risk of extinction in the wild.
VU	Vulnerable	The species is facing a high risk of extinction in the wild.
NT	Near threatened	The species does not meet any of the criteria that would categorise it as risking extinction but it is likely to do so in the future.
LC	Least concern	There are no current identifiable risks to the species.
DD	Data deficient	There is inadequate information to make an assessment of the risks to this species.

== Order: Artiodactyla (even-toed ungulates) ==
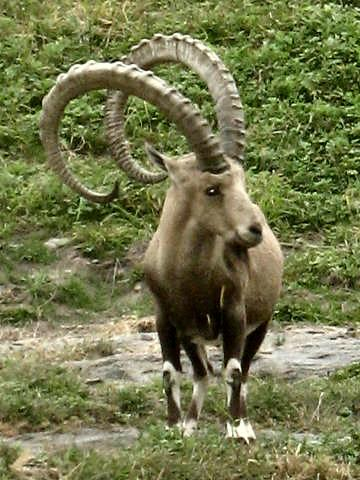
Nubian ibex

The even-toed ungulates are ungulates whose weight is borne about equally by the third and fourth toes, rather than mostly or entirely by the third as in perissodactyls. There are about 220 artiodactyl species, including many that are of great economic importance to humans.

- Family: Bovidae (cattle, antelope, sheep, goats)
  - Subfamily: Antilopinae
    - Genus: Gazella
      - Mountain gazelle, G. gazella EN
- Family: Cervidae (deer)
  - Subfamily: Capreolinae
    - Genus: Capreolus
      - Roe deer, C. capreolus LC
  - Subfamily: Cervinae
    - Genus: Cervus
      - Red deer, C. elaphus LC
- Family: Suidae (pigs)
  - Subfamily: Suinae
    - Genus: Sus
      - Wild boar, S. scrofa LC

== Order: Carnivora (carnivorans) ==
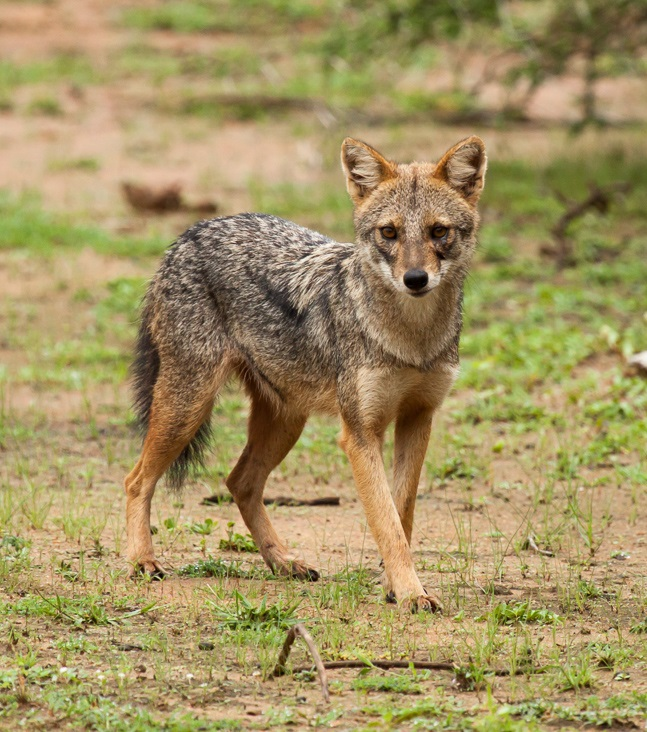
Golden jackal

There are over 260 species of carnivorans, the majority of which feed primarily on meat. They have a characteristic skull shape and dentition.

- Suborder: Feliformia
  - Family: Felidae (cats)
    - Subfamily: Felinae
      - Genus: Caracal
        - Caracal, C. caracal LC
      - Genus: Felis
        - Jungle cat, F. chaus LC
        - African wildcat, F. lybica LC
  - Family: Herpestidae (mongooses)
    - Genus: Herpestes
      - Egyptian mongoose, H. ichneumon LC
  - Family: Hyaenidae (hyaenas)
    - Genus: Hyaena
      - Striped hyena, H. hyaena NT
- Suborder: Caniformia
  - Family: Canidae (dogs, foxes)
    - Genus: Canis
      - Golden jackal, C. aureus LC
        - Syrian jackal, C. a. syriacus
      - Grey wolf, C. lupus LC
        - Arabian wolf, C. l. arabs
    - Genus: Vulpes
      - Red fox, V. vulpes LC
  - Family: Ursidae (bears)
    - Genus: Ursus
      - Brown bear, U. arctos LC
        - Syrian brown bear, U. a. syriacus
  - Family: Mustelidae (mustelids)
    - Genus: Lutra
      - Eurasian otter, L. lutra NT
    - Genus: Martes
      - Beech marten, M. foina LC
    - Genus: Meles
      - Caucasian badger, M. canescens NE
    - Genus: Mellivora
      - Honey badger, M. capensis LC
    - Genus: Mustela
      - Least weasel, M. nivalis LC
    - Genus: Vormela
      - Marbled polecat, V. peregusna VU
  - Family: Phocidae (earless seals)
    - Genus: Monachus
      - Mediterranean monk seal, M. monachus EN possibly extirpated

== Order: Cetacea (whales) ==
The order Cetacea includes whales, dolphins and porpoises. They are the mammals most fully adapted to aquatic life with a spindle-shaped nearly hairless body, protected by a thick layer of blubber, and forelimbs and tail modified to provide propulsion underwater.

Species listed below also includes species being recorded in Levantine Sea except for gray whale.

- Suborder: Mysticeti
  - Family: Balaenopteridae
    - Genus: Balaenoptera
      - Blue whale, Balaenoptera musculus EN (possible)
      - Fin whale, Balaenoptera physalus EN
      - Common minke whale, Balaenoptera acutorostrata LC
- Subfamily: Megapterinae
  - Genus: Megaptera
    - Humpback whale, M. novaeangliae LC
  - Family: Balaenidae
    - Genus: Eubalaena
      - North Atlantic right whale, Eubalaena glacialis CR (possible)
- Suborder: Odontoceti
  - Family: Physeteridae (sperm whales)
    - Genus: Physeter
      - Sperm whale, Physeter macrocephalus VU
  - Family: Ziphiidae (beaked whales)
    - Genus: Hyperoodon
      - Northern bottlenose whale, Hyperoodon ampullatus LC
    - Genus: Mesoplodon
      - Blainville's beaked whale, Mesoplodon densirostris DD
    - Genus: Ziphius
      - Cuvier's beaked whale, Ziphius cavirostris LC
    - Genus: Mesoplodon
      - Gervais' beaked whale, Ziphius cavirostris DD
  - Family: Delphinidae (oceanic dolphins)
    - Genus: Delphinus
      - Short-beaked common dolphin, Delphinus delphis LC
    - Genus: Grampus
      - Risso's dolphin, Grampus griseus LC
    - Genus: Pseudorca
      - False killer whale, Pseudorca crassidens DD
    - Genus: Stenella
      - Striped dolphin, Stenella coeruleoalba LC
        - Pantropical spotted dolphin, Stenella attenuata LR/cd (possible)
      - Genus: Sousa
        - Indo-Pacific humpback dolphin, Sousa chinensis DD
    - Genus: Steno
      - Rough-toothed dolphin, Steno bredanensis LC
    - Genus: Tursiops
      - Common bottlenose dolphin, Tursiops truncatus LC
      - Genus: Grampus
        - Risso's dolphin, Grampus griseus LC
      - Genus: Orcinus
        - Orca, Orcinus orca DD
      - Genus: Pseudorca
        - False killer whale, Pseudorca crassidens DD
      - Genus: Globicephala
        - Long-finned pilot whale, Globicephala melas DD

== Order: Chiroptera (bats) ==
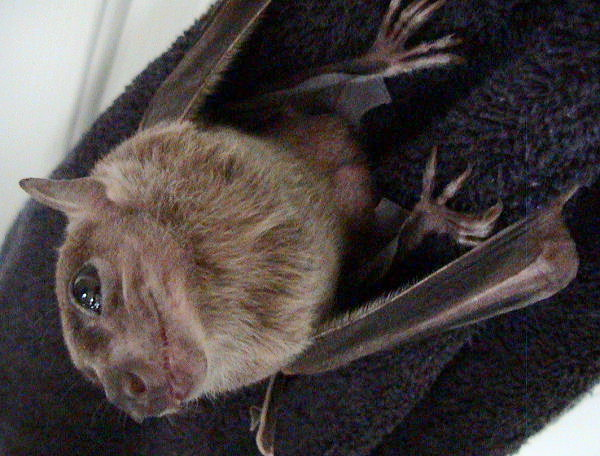
Egyptian fruit bat

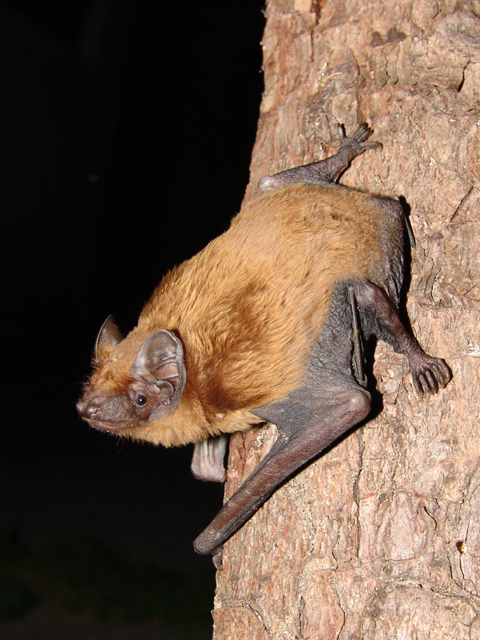
Common noctule

The bats' most distinguishing feature is that their forelimbs are developed as wings, making them the only mammals capable of flight. Bat species account for about 20% of all mammals.

- Family: Pteropodidae (flying foxes, Old World fruit bats)
  - Subfamily: Pteropodinae
    - Genus: Rousettus
      - Egyptian fruit bat, R. aegyptiacus LC
- Family: Vespertilionidae
  - Subfamily: Myotinae
    - Genus: Myotis
      - Lesser mouse-eared bat, M. blythii LC
      - Long-fingered bat, M. capaccinii VU
      - Geoffroy's bat, M. emarginatus LC
      - Greater mouse-eared bat, M. myotis LC
      - Whiskered bat, M. mystacinus LC
      - Natterer's bat, M. nattereri LC
  - Subfamily: Vespertilioninae
    - Genus: Eptesicus
      - Serotine bat, Eptesicus serotinus
    - Genus: Hypsugo
      - Savi's pipistrelle, Hypsugo savii
    - Genus: Nyctalus
      - Common noctule, Nyctalus noctula
    - Genus: Pipistrellus
      - Kuhl's pipistrelle, Pipistrellus kuhlii LC
      - Common pipistrelle, Pipistrellus pipistrellus LC
    - Genus: Plecotus
      - Grey long-eared bat, Plecotus austriacus
  - Subfamily: Miniopterinae
    - Genus: Miniopterus
      - Common bent-wing bat, M. schreibersii VU
- Family: Molossidae
  - Genus: Tadarida
    - European free-tailed bat, T. teniotis LC
- Family: Nycteridae
  - Genus: Nycteris
    - Egyptian slit-faced bat, Nycteris thebaica LC
- Family: Rhinolophidae
  - Subfamily: Rhinolophinae
    - Genus: Rhinolophus
      - Mediterranean horseshoe bat, Rhinolophus euryale VU
      - Greater horseshoe bat, Rhinolophus ferrumequinum
      - Lesser horseshoe bat, Rhinolophus hipposideros LC

== Order: Erinaceomorpha (hedgehogs and gymnures) ==
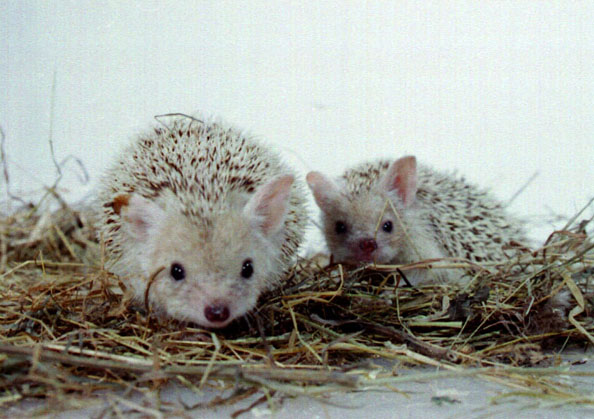
Long-eared hedgehog

The order Erinaceomorpha contains a single family, Erinaceidae, which comprise the hedgehogs and gymnures. The hedgehogs are easily recognised by their spines while gymnures look more like large rats.

- Family: Erinaceidae (hedgehogs)
  - Subfamily: Erinaceinae
    - Genus: Erinaceus
      - Southern white-breasted hedgehog, E. concolor LC
    - Genus: Hemiechinus
      - Long-eared hedgehog, H. auritus LC

== Order: Hyracoidea (hyraxes) ==
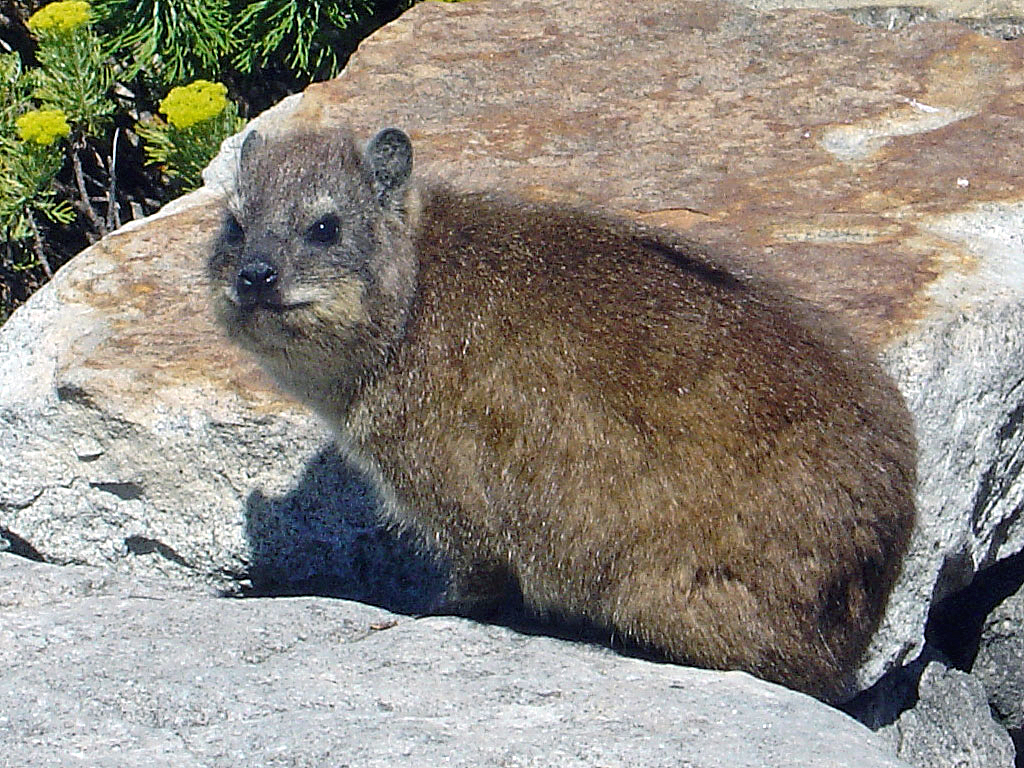
Cape hyrax

The hyraxes are any of four species of fairly small, thickset, herbivorous mammals in the order Hyracoidea. About the size of a domestic cat, they are well-furred, with rounded bodies and a stumpy tail. They are native to Africa and the Middle East.

- Family: Procaviidae (hyraxes)
  - Genus: Procavia
    - Cape hyrax, P. capensis LC

== Order: Lagomorpha (lagomorphs) ==
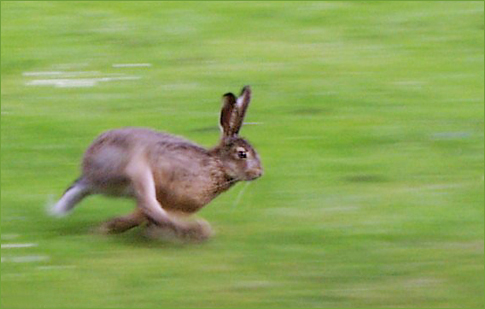
European hare

The lagomorphs comprise two families, Leporidae (hares and rabbits), and Ochotonidae (pikas). Though they can resemble rodents, and were classified as a superfamily in that order until the early 20th century, they have since been considered a separate order. They differ from rodents in a number of physical characteristics, such as having four incisors in the upper jaw rather than two.

- Family: Leporidae (rabbits, hares)
  - Genus: Lepus
    - Cape hare, L. capensis LC
    - European hare, L. europaeus LC

== Order: Rodentia (rodents) ==
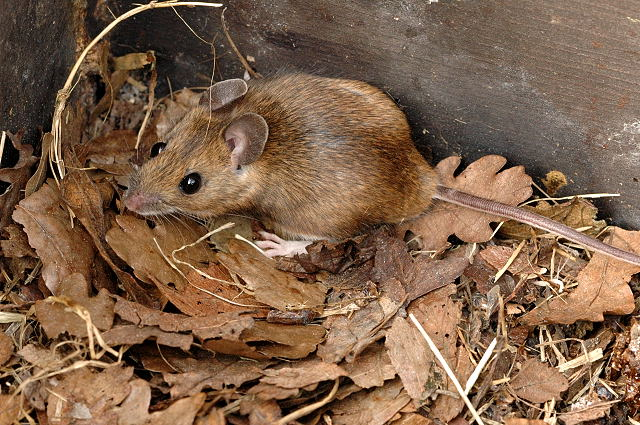
Yellow-necked mouse

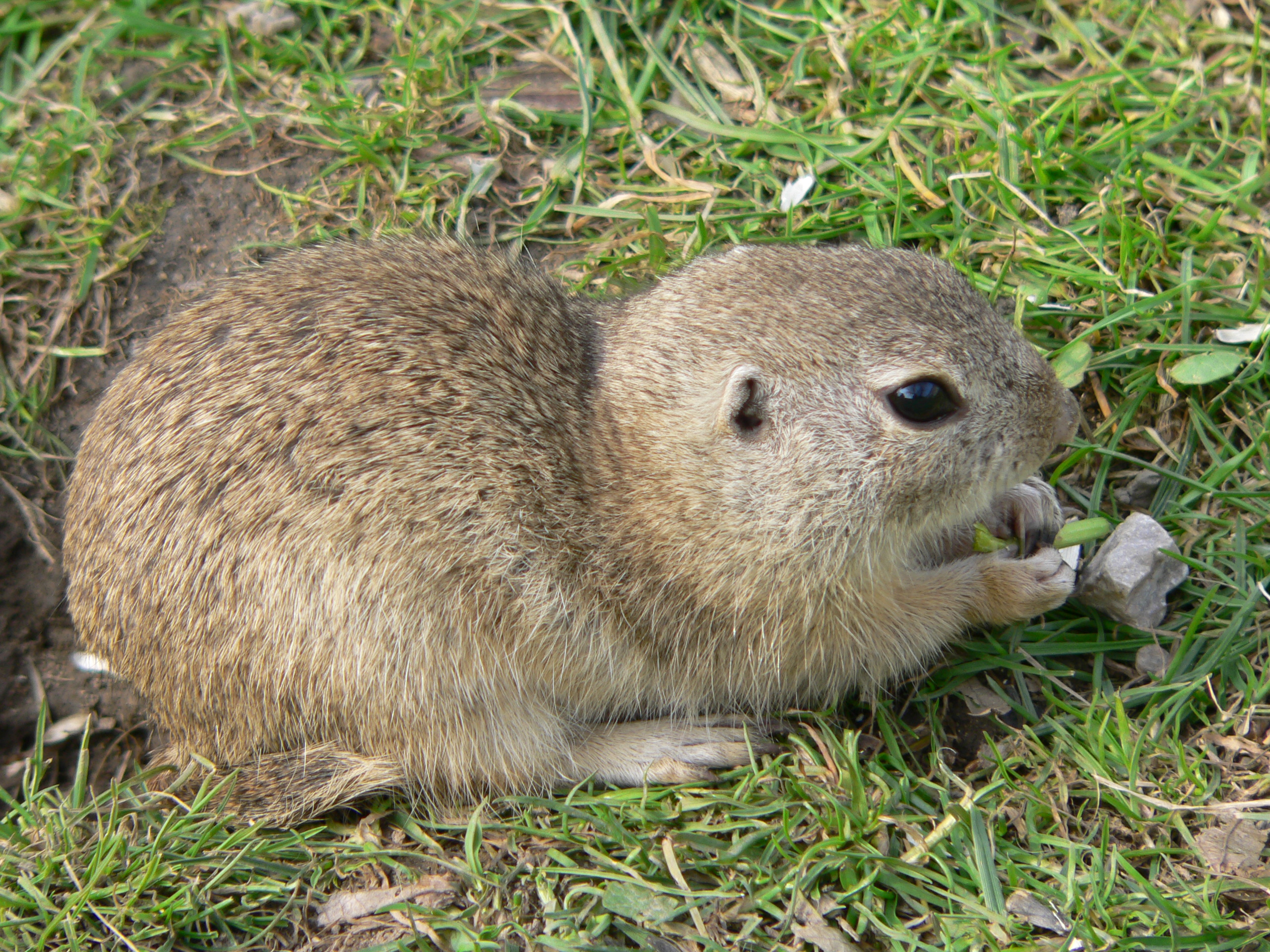
European ground squirrel

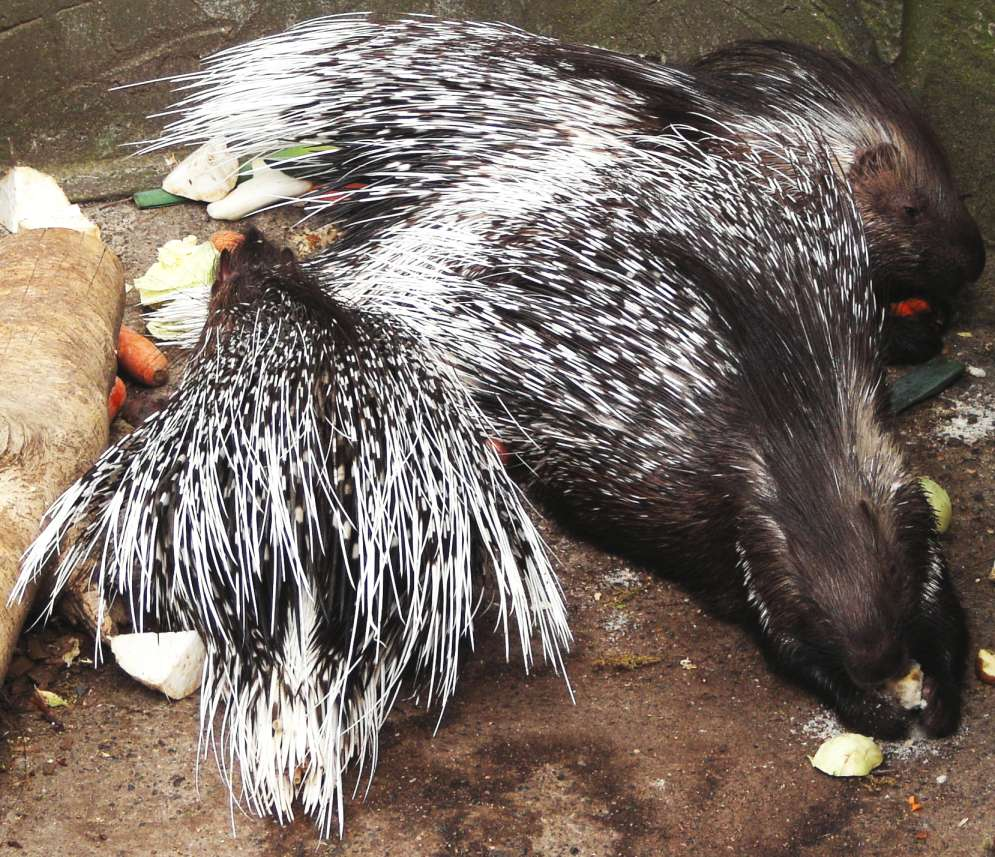
Indian crested porcupine

Rodents make up the largest order of mammals, with over 40% of mammalian species. They have two incisors in the upper and lower jaw which grow continually and must be kept short by gnawing. Most rodents are small though the capybara can weigh up to 45 kg (99 lb).

- Suborder: Hystricomorpha
  - Family: Hystricidae
    - Genus: Hystrix
      - Indian crested porcupine, H. indica LC
- Suborder: Sciurognathi
  - Family: Sciuridae (squirrels)
    - Subfamily: Sciurinae
      - Tribe: Sciurini
        - Genus: Sciurus
          - Caucasian squirrel, S. anomalus LC
    - Subfamily: Xerinae
      - Tribe: Marmotini
        - Genus: Spermophilus
          - Asia Minor ground squirrel, Spermophilus xanthoprymnus
  - Family: Gliridae (dormice)
    - Subfamily: Leithiinae
      - Genus: Dryomys
        - Forest dormouse, Dryomys nitedula
      - Genus: Eliomys
        - Asian garden dormouse, Eliomys melanurus LC
  - Family: Spalacidae
    - Subfamily: Spalacinae
      - Genus: Nannospalax
        - Palestine mole rat, Nannospalax ehrenbergi LC
  - Family: Cricetidae
    - Subfamily: Cricetinae
      - Genus: Cricetulus
        - Grey dwarf hamster, Cricetulus migratorius
      - Genus: Mesocricetus
        - Turkish hamster, Mesocricetus brandti
    - Subfamily: Arvicolinae
      - Genus: Microtus
        - Günther's vole, Microtus guentheri
        - Persian vole, Microtus irani
        - Social vole, Microtus socialis
  - Family: Muridae (mice, rats, voles, gerbils, hamsters)
    - Subfamily: Gerbillinae
      - Genus: Gerbillus
        - Wagner's gerbil, Gerbillus dasyurus
      - Genus: Meriones
        - Tristram's jird, Meriones tristrami
    - Subfamily: Murinae
      - Genus: Apodemus
        - Persian field mouse, Apodemus arianus
        - Yellow-necked mouse, Apodemus flavicollis
        - Broad-toothed field mouse, Apodemus mystacinus
      - Genus: Mus
        - House mouse, Mus musculus
      - Genus: Rattus
        - Brown rat, R. norvegicus LC introduced

== Order: Soricomorpha (shrews, moles, and solenodons) ==
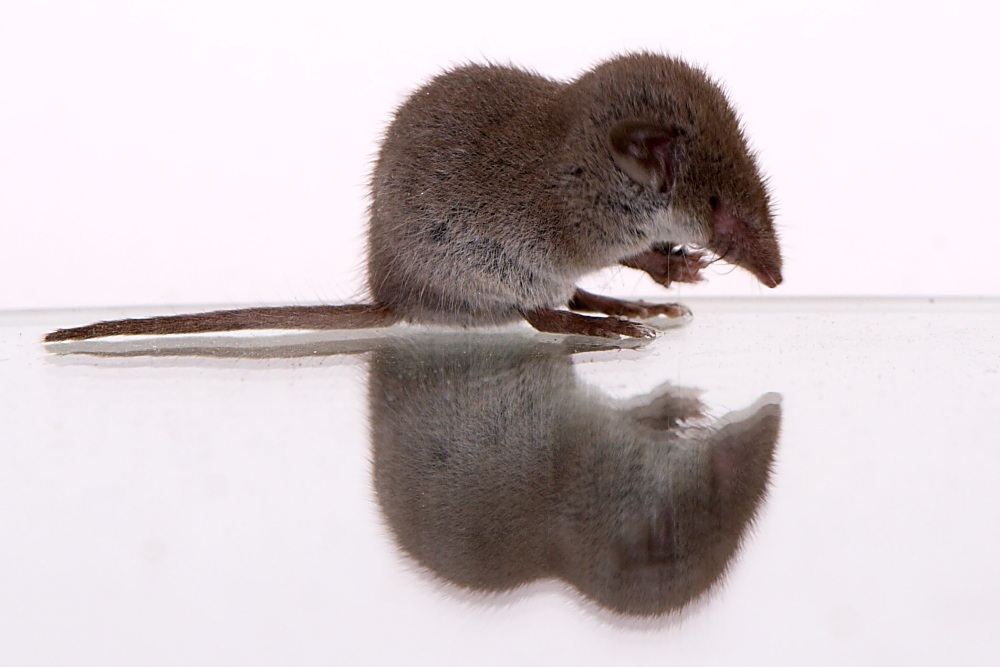
Lesser white-toothed shrew

The "shrew-forms" are insectivorous mammals. The shrews and solenodons closely resemble mice while the moles are stout-bodied burrowers.

- Family: Soricidae (shrews)
  - Subfamily: Crocidurinae
    - Genus: Crocidura
      - Bicolored shrew, C. leucodon LC
      - Lesser white-toothed shrew, C. suaveolens LC
    - Genus: Suncus
      - Etruscan shrew, S. etruscus LC

== Locally extinct ==
The following species are locally extinct in the country:

- Cheetah, Acinonyx jubatus
- Hartebeest, Alcelaphus buselaphus
- Wild goat, Capra aegagrus
- Nubian ibex, Capra nubiana
- Persian fallow deer, Dama mesopotamica
- Onager, Equus hemionus
- Lion, Panthera leo
- Leopard, Panthera pardus

== See also ==
- Wildlife of Lebanon
- List of chordate orders
- Lists of mammals by region
- Mammal classification
