= Orontes minnow =

Scientific classification
- Kingdom: Animalia
- Phylum: Chordata
- Class: Actinopterygii
- Order: Cypriniformes
- Family: Leuciscidae
- Genus: Pseudophoxinus
- Species: P. kervillei

Binomial name
- Pseudophoxinus kervillei (Pellegrin, 1911)

Species of fish

The Orontes minnow (Pseudophoxinus kervillei) is a species of freshwater ray-finned fish belonging to the family Leuciscidae, which includes the daces, Eurasian minnows and related species. It is found in Israel, Jordan, Lebanon, and Syria. It is considered by some taxonomic authorities to be conspecific with the Levantine minnow.

== Etymology ==
The fish is named in honor of the French biologist, archaeologist and photographer Henri Gadeau de Kerville (1858–1940), who collected the holotype specimen.
