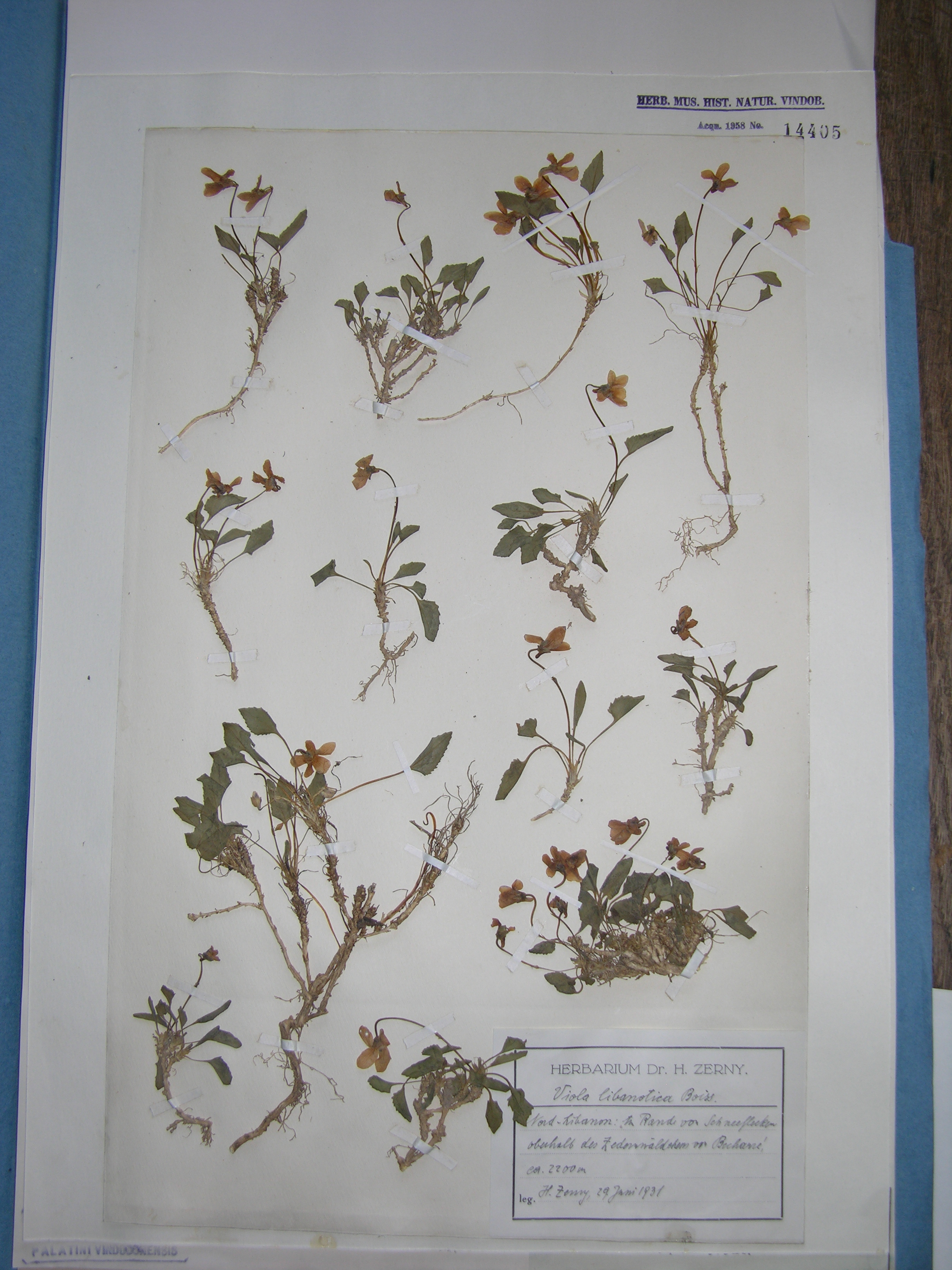

Conservation status
- Endangered (IUCN 3.1)

Scientific classification
- Kingdom: Plantae
- Clade: Embryophytes
- Clade: Tracheophytes
- Clade: Spermatophytes
- Clade: Angiosperms
- Clade: Eudicots
- Clade: Rosids
- Order: Malpighiales
- Family: Violaceae
- Genus: Viola
- Species: V. libanotica

Binomial name
- Viola libanotica Boissier 1849

= Viola libanotica =

Species of flowering plant

Viola libanotica is a species of flowering plant in the Violaceae family. It is referred to by the common name Lebanon violet and is an evergreen running herb. It is endemic to the cold heights of Lebanon. The plant has dark green leaves and purple flowers.
