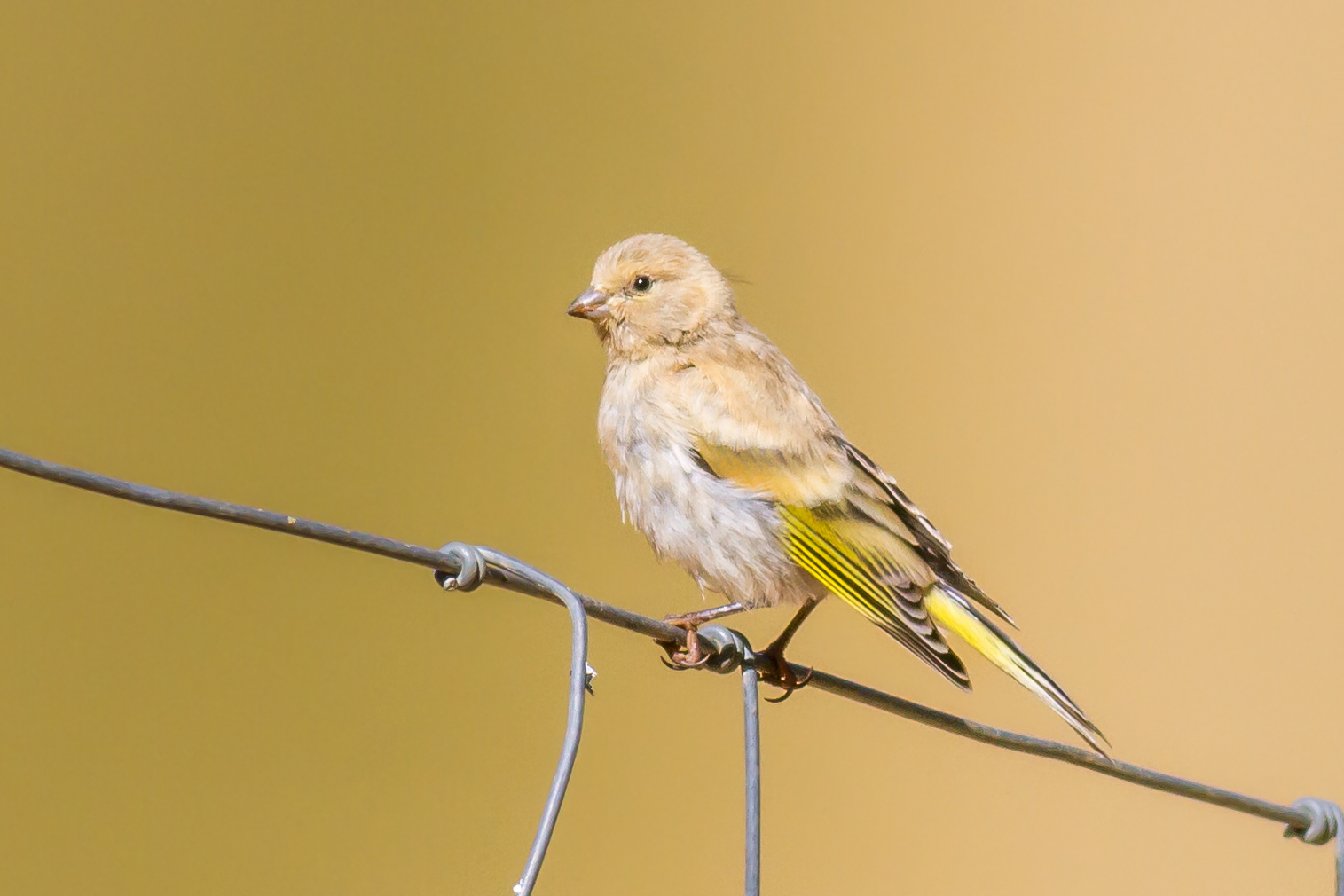
- in Israel

Conservation status
- Vulnerable (IUCN 3.1)

Scientific classification
- Kingdom: Animalia
- Phylum: Chordata
- Class: Aves
- Order: Passeriformes
- Family: Fringillidae
- Subfamily: Carduelinae
- Genus: Serinus
- Species: S. syriacus

Binomial name
- Serinus syriacus Bonaparte, 1850

= Syrian serin =

Species of bird

The Syrian serin (Serinus syriacus) is a brightly coloured small passerine bird in the finch family Fringillidae.

== Description ==
The Syrian serin is prettily coloured with bright yellow and pale grey feathers. The eyes are large and are surrounded by a bright yellow ring. The beak is grey and the legs are pale pinkish-grey. It has a long trilling call and may also chirp and twitter.

== Distribution and habitat ==
Syrian serins breed in Syria, Palestine, Lebanon, Israel and Jordan, at altitudes of between 900 and 1,900 metres (3,000 and 6,200 ft). The population in Jordan makes local movements in winter, but the birds of Lebanon, Israel and Syria migrate to wintering grounds in Egypt, Turkey and Iraq. They inhabit rocky areas with oak and conifer shrubs or trees and frequent grasslands and fields feeding mainly on the seeds of annuals and grasses. In Southwestern Jordan, its main diet during winter is the seeds of Artemisia.

== Breeding ==
Males court females with a song display, and each pair builds a nest in a tree once the snow has begun to melt in April or May. Four pale blue, glossy eggs are laid in April and May, and the female incubates these for 12–14 days. The young fledge after just 14–16 days and the parents then move up to around 1,750 metres in July and August to produce a second clutch. When conditions allow, the pair can produce three broods. In southwest Jordan, most pairs apparently breed only once per year as suitable breeding habitat does not exist at higher elevations.

== Conservation ==
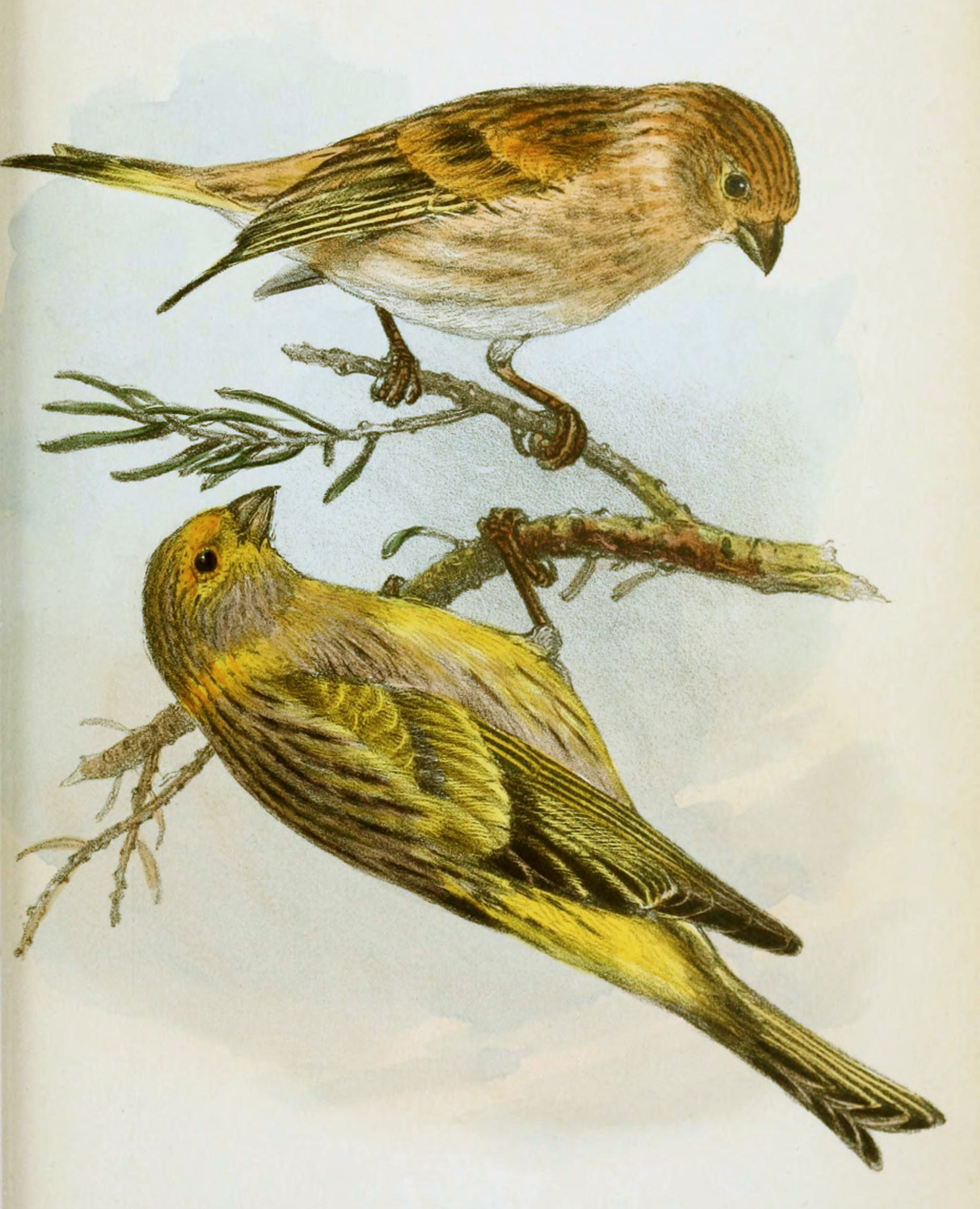
Illustration from "The Ibis", a Journal of Ornithology, vol. iv. 1868.

The species is evaluated by IUCN as Vulnerable. The population is declining due to logging, livestock production and hunting.
