= Lebanese Physically Handicapped Union =

Lebanese Physical Handicapped Union (LPHU) اتحاد المقعديين اللبنانيين
- Founded: 1981
- Type: Non-profit
- Location: Lebanon
- Region served: Lebanon
- Key people: Sylvana Lakkis (President)
- Website: http://www.lphu.com

The Lebanese Physically Handicapped Union (LPHU) is an advocacy organization for disabled people in Lebanon founded in 1981. Currently the organization is sponsored in its efforts to increase the accessibility of polling places for disabled people by the International Foundation for Electoral Systems. LPHU found in a recent survey that less than 1% of the polling places in the country of Lebanon are fully accessible by the disabled.

== History ==
A small group of disabled people in Lebanon founded LPHU in mid-1981. LPHU remained active throughout the war which surrounded the Israeli Invasion of Lebanon. They were active during the political seasons leading up to the 1992, 1996, and 1998 and were even able to get 3 disabled men elected to local municipal council governments in 1998.

== Support ==
LPHU is supported by the International community. Representatives from the organization attended the UN Conference on Women in 1995. Also, LPHU has begun working with similar organization in Yemen, and in other countries throughout the eastern Mediterranean including countries from the former Yugoslavia. Additionally, they have gained significant support in election support activities, such as polls and campaigning for polling station access, from the International Foundation for Electoral Systems.
