= Geology of Lebanon =

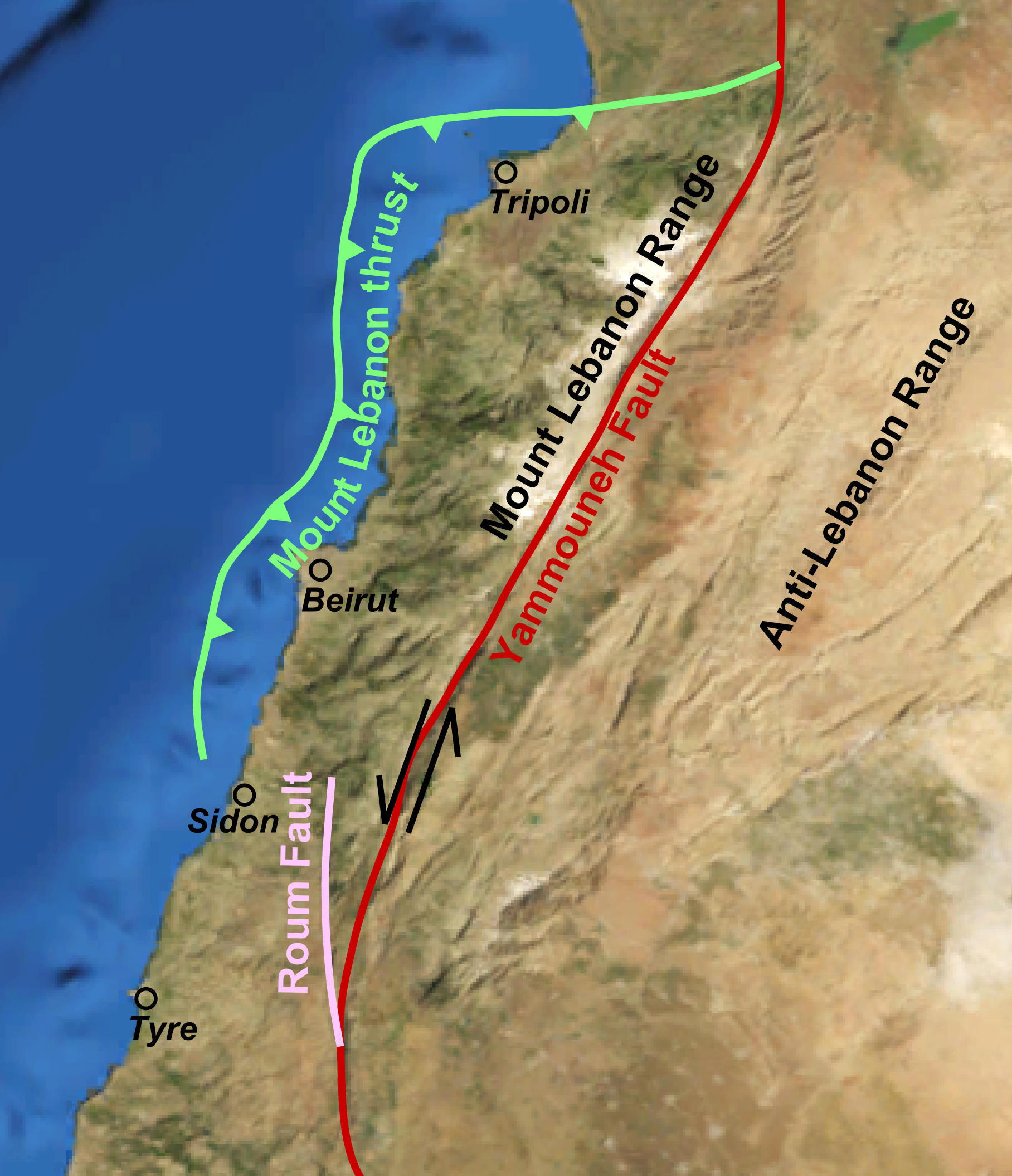
Tectonic situation of Lebanon

The geology of Lebanon remains poorly studied prior to the Jurassic. The country is heavily dominated by limestone, sandstone, other sedimentary rocks, and basalt, defined by its tectonic history. In Lebanon, 70% of exposed rocks are limestone karst.

== Tectonic situation ==
Lebanon's tectonic history is closely related to the Levant Fracture System, a left-lateral strike-slip fault zone, separating the Arabian Plate from the African Plate. The intracontinental Palmyride fold belt, with a maximum elevation of 1,385 metres (4,544 ft) above sea level, is an important structural feature that dominates much of Lebanon and Syria, extending northeast towards the Euphrates Graben from the Levant Fracture System. The fold belt extends 400 kilometres (250 mi) in total, with fold wavelengths of 5 to 10 kilometres (3.1 to 6.2 mi). The fold belt forms ridges and small depressions filled with clastic material from the Paleogene, Neogene and Quaternary. Geologists debate whether the Anti-Lebanon Mountains are part of the southern extent of the fold belt and whether some faults are detached in Triassic-Kurrachine evaporate deposits. The northern and southern Palmyrides are divided by the Jhar Fault, which runs east to west. Because of differing depths to metamorphic basement rocks on different ends of the Palmyrides, some geologists have suggested that the Jhar Fault might be the remains of a Pan-African suture zone from the late Proterozoic.

The modern geology and geography of Lebanon is influenced in part by the opening of the Red Sea in the Eocene and Oligocene as well as the formation of the Levant Fracture System, from the Oligocene until the late Miocene, with the separation of the African and Arabian plates.

=== Mount Lebanon ===
Mount Lebanon dominates much of Lebanon, bounded to the north by the Yammouneh Fault (a part of the Levant Fracture System). Gravity modeling suggests 4.5 to 7 kilometres (2.8 to 4.3 mi) of Jurassic and Cretaceous sediments in the sedimentary section of the mountain, with lithologies including limestone, dolomite and sandstone. In the north, these sediments are blanketed by basalt flows from the late Neogene and Quaternary sedimentary deposits from the Tripoli-Homs Depression, that separate Mount Lebanon from the Syrian Coastal Ranges.

The northern central part of Mount Lebanon is part of an anticlinorium, ending in the 100 kilometres (62 mi) Western Lebanon Monocline. There is no equivalent monocline in the east, probably because it was destroyed by the Yammouneh Fault.

=== Bekaa ===
Bekaa is a medium altitude plain, with an average ground elevation of 900 metres (3,000 ft), bounded by Mount Lebanon in the west and the Anti-Lebanon mountains to the east. Based on gravity surveys in the late 1990s, it was concluded the Bekaa sedimentary basin to be up to 9 kilometres (30,000 ft) thick, probably tied to the uplift associated with the Levant Fracture System. Most of the sediments beneath the plain are lacustrine or continental deposits, cloaked in thick Pliocene and Quaternary deposits, including alluvial fans.

=== Anti-Lebanon Mountains ===
The Anti-Lebanon Mountains drop beneath the Houleh Depression and the Homs Depression in Israel and Syria respectively and the range has a similar structure to Mount Lebanon. Mount Hermon, the highest point in the range, in the south, is covered in middle Jurassic sedimentary rocks. The 150 kilometres (93 mi) long Serghaya Fault is the Anti-Lebanon equivalent of the Yammouneh fault, spanning from the edge of the Dead Sea rift to the eastern side of Mount Hermon. It is only well studied at the village of Serghaya, where it comes to the surface. Elsewhere it is obscured by Pliocene and Pleistocene volcanic material. The Chebaa-Rashaya Fault is a 45 kilometres (28 mi) long fault, branching off the eastern edge of the Dead Sea rift, parallel to the Yammouneh Fault and forms the western limit of Mount Hermon.

== Geologic history ==
In the Paleozoic, the supercontinents Gondwana and Laurussia were separated by the Rheic Ocean. These supercontinents converged, closing the Rheic Ocean and resulting in the mountain uplift of the Hercynian orogeny. Geologists have recognized rock deformation and a stratigraphic unconformity dating to the Hercynian orogeny and spanning the margins of the African and Arabian plates, including Lebanon. The region was situated on the northern shore of Gondwana, adjacent to the Paleo-Tethys Ocean. The Arabian Plate within Gondwana was located at approximately 30 degrees south latitude.

During the Permian and Triassic the Cimmerian Superterrane, which included parts of Turkey, Iran and Tibet broke off the northern passive margin of Gondwana, creating a new ocean—the Neo-Tethys—which widened as the Cimmerian block edged northward toward the Eurasian Plate. In what is now Lebanon, the Levant Basin, which begins offshore in the deep and goes inland, started to form in the Permian. Also in the early Triassic, the Eastern Mediterranean Rift opened between Tunisia and Syria, filling with thick layers of marine silicate sediment and some continental deposits now located in the Palmyra Basin. Microcontinents from the Cimmerian Superterrane, including Iran, collided with the Eurasian Plate by the late Triassic, while the Neo-Tethys oceanic crust subducated northwards under Eurasia.

In the Sinai, the Triassic is preserved with open-ocean carbonate sediments and river sediments, as well as clastic material that spans into the Negev Desert. When the Cimmerian blocks dispersed in the Cretaceous, it caused rifting in the Afro-Arabian Plate area, continuing the expansion of the Palmyra and Levant basins. During the late Cretaceous and the start of the Cenozoic subsidence occurred in the rifted areas and the Levant Basin was part of the Messinian Salinity Crisis which left up to two kilometers of evaporate in the dried out Mediterranean region. The evaporates are now important within Arabia for their role as cap rocks for oil and natural gas deposits, often housed in Oligocene and Miocene deposits. Deposition has continued since the Cretaceous, with periods of tectonic contraction, including one that is still slowly ongoing, resulting in the erosion of the Palmyride fold belt in Syria.

== Stratigraphy ==
The oldest exposed rocks in Lebanon date to the Early Jurassic. Although the basement geology of the area remains poorly studied, geologically similar locations are known from deep drilling in Syria, Israel and Jordan. In those areas (inferred to be nearly the same in Lebanon), the Paleozoic is marked by thick siliclastic deposits, while Mesozoic and Cenozoic rocks are typically carbonates or evaporates.

=== Jurassic ===
The final rifting of the Levant Basin happened in the Late Jurassic. The Arad Group of dolomite, limestone and marl in Lebanon is virtually identical to similar units of the same age in the Syrian Coast Ranges. A large erosional event in the Kimmeridgian led the ocean to retreat westward, resulting in erosion. Mantle plumes may have been present beneath the Levant in the Late Jurassic, which is posited as an explanation for the alkaline volcanic rocks found in Mount Lebanon.

The Kesrouane Formation is the most prominent formation from the Jurassic in Lebanon, forming a 1,300 metres (4,300 ft) thick succession of shallow marine dolomite. Thermal subsidence in the Palmyra Basin, may have opened additional room in the basin for deposition. The Bhannes Formation, a basalt complex that also includes shale, marl and carbonates overlies the Kesrouane. Potassium and argon dating found that volcanic rocks, outcropping near faults were up to 25 million years younger than Bhannes Formation sedimentary rocks.

Block faulting and basalt flows continued with the Bikfaya Formation, which is accompanied by large and easily recognizable limestone deposits that easily form cliffs. The Salima Formation lies on top of the Bikfaya, consisting of oolitic limestone, clay, marl and sandstone, although its age is currently under debate. Other significant formations from the Jurassic include the Chouf Formation, Abeih Formation, Mdairej Formation, Hammana Formation and the Cenomanian Sannine Formation as well as the Maameltain Formation.

=== Cretaceous-Pliocene ===
Lebanon shifted to an open marine depositional environment, evidenced by marl laden with foraminifera. The offshore environment was timed with subsidence in Arabia. The Chekka Formation spans the Cretaceous into the Paleocene, made up of white chalk and marly limestone, with beds typically 20 to 50 centimeters thick. Chekka units also contain bands of chert and phosphate nodules, along with units rich in organic matter.

==== Eocene ====
The early Eocene is marked by the Arak Formation, siliclastic and carbonate deposits left from the continuation of an offshore environment. The Palmyrides region was covered in limestones in the late Eocene. In some cases, basin deposits appear similar to the Chekka Formation, with chert and marl. Dark cherts, with signs of bioturbation are found in northern Lebanon.

==== Miocene ====
Miocene rocks lie unconformably atop Eocene units, with almost the entire Oligocene missing. Some geologists suggest that the Oligocene and Lower Miocene are actually preserved in southern Lebanon as turbiditic sandstones. In the Miocene, the region underwent uplift, the seashore retreated and basalt flows blanked some parts of Lebanon and Syria. In particular, Syria experienced extensive basalt flows between 16 and 8 Ma. Some large marine deposits from the Miocene are located to the west of Mount Lebanon, while alluvial conglomerates covered limestones in Bekaa with up 600 meters of material.

=== Pliocene-Quaternary ===
The Pliocene succession measures 450 meters north of Tripoli and in the Bekaa, with a mix of sediments and basalt. Pliocene marine succession in the low-lying areas of Lebanon left basalt, chalky limestone, marl and clay. In the Bekaa, there are also conglomerate deposits from mountain erosion during this period. Within the last 2.5 million years, ramleh coastal sands made of carbonate and quartz grains are commonplace, sometimes loosely cemented with calcite. Terra rosa, red clay and quartz deposits are found in major cities like Tripoli and Beirut.

== Natural hazards ==
The Lebanese National Council for Scientific Research have extensively studied the Roum Fault, which is seismically active and extends close to Beirut.

== Nature reserves ==
There are eight nature reserves in Lebanon.

- Al Shouf Cedar Nature Reserve. It is considered the biggest nature reserve in Lebanon, spanning an area of 165 km^{2}.
- Tannourine Cedar Nature Reserve
- Jabal Moussa Biosphere Reserve
- Horsh Ehden
- Jabal Al Rihane Biosphere Reserve
- Palm Islands Nature Reserve
- Tyre Coast Nature Reserve
- Wadi al-Hujeir Nature Reserve. Established in 2010, it covers an area of 26 km^{2}.

== Hydrogeology ==
Jurassic and Cretaceous volcanics often form impermeable units, containing aquifers, along with the Chouf, Abeih and Chekka Formations. The Chekka submarine springs are an example of a confined Cennomanian and Turonian aquifer system. Artesian springs are common along the north coast. Underground springs and melting snow feed 11 rivers in Mount Lebanon and two in the Anti-Lebanon mountains. Annually, Lebanon receives 80% of precipitation between November and March, a total of 10,000,000,000 cubic metres (6.1×10^{14} cu in) of precipitation, 30% of which falls in the Bekaa. According to the UN, Lebanon's water demand already exceeds supply.

== Mining ==
Small mines have worked to extract galena and smithsonite from the Jurassic Bikfaya Formation in southern Bekaa and on the southern slope of Mount Hermon. Hematite and limonite are found in Upper Jurassic and Lower Cretaceous units near Mount Lebanon and the associated Marjaba mines yielded tens of thousands of tons of iron oxides between 1953 and 1955. Lignite deposits in the Chouf Sandstone Formation have occasionally been mined, but they are poor quality due to high sulfur content due to pyrite.

Raw materials for construction is now the main driver for existing mines in Lebanon. Cement factories rely on the Cretaceous Mammeltain and Chekkaa Formations. Historically, Quaternary travertine, oolitic limestone from the Maameltain Formation and other limestones were used for decorative architecture.

=== Petroleum exploration ===
Only seven exploratory wells have been drilled in Lebanon, beginning in 1947–1948. Compagnie Libanaise de Petroles, or CLP, was the only company to receive concessions in Lebanon, with two blocks covering almost the entire country. An Italian company bought a 50% share and drilled two exploratory wells in 1963 and the last exploratory well was drilled in 1966. From 1970 through the 2000s, Oxoco, Schlumberger, Spectrum and Fugro and Petroleum Geo-Services have conducted 2D and 3D seismic surveys. The Lebanese Parliament approved Law 132 in 2010 to authorize offshore drilling and set up a permanent Data Room at the Ministry of Energy and Water in 2011.

Although none of the onshore exploratory wells found petroleum, none reached deeper than the Jurassic Kesrouane Formation. Lebanon has extensive evidence of hydrocarbons in the form of bitumen and asphalt from rock cuttings and some reports of natural gas in Yohmor and Sohmor wells near Bekaa, drilled into Eocene and Paleocene rock.
