= International rankings of Lebanon =

The following are international rankings of Lebanon.

== Demographics ==
- United Nations: Population, ranked 124 out of 223 countries
- CIA World Factbook: Urbanization ranked 21 out of 193 countries

== Economy ==
- The Wall Street Journal and The Heritage Foundation: Index of Economic Freedom 2018, ranked 95 out of 179 countries
- World Bank: Ease of Doing Business Index 2015, ranked 99 out of 181 countries
- International Monetary Fund: GDP per capita 2017, ranked 51 out of 179 countries
- World Bank: GDP per capita 2016, ranked 47 out of 170 countries
- CIA World Factbook: GDP per capita 2013, ranked 67 out of 192 countries

In the 2009 quality of life index, Lebanon ranked in the last place ( out of 194 countries )

Lebanon ranked in the 35th largest exporter of IT ICT enabled services among 173 countries

== Education ==
Listed by the World Economic Forum's 2013 Global Information Technology Report, Lebanon has been ranked globally as the fourth best country for math and science education, and as the tenth best overall for quality of education. In Quality of management schools, the country was ranked 131st worldwide. These rankings are based on the Executive Opinion Survey, carried out as part of the WEF's Global Competitiveness Report, based on polling a sample of business leaders in each respective country.

- United Nations gross enrolment ratio 2005, ranked 47 out of 177 countries
- United Nations Development Programme: literacy rate 2007/2008, ranked 96 out of 177 countries

== Geography ==
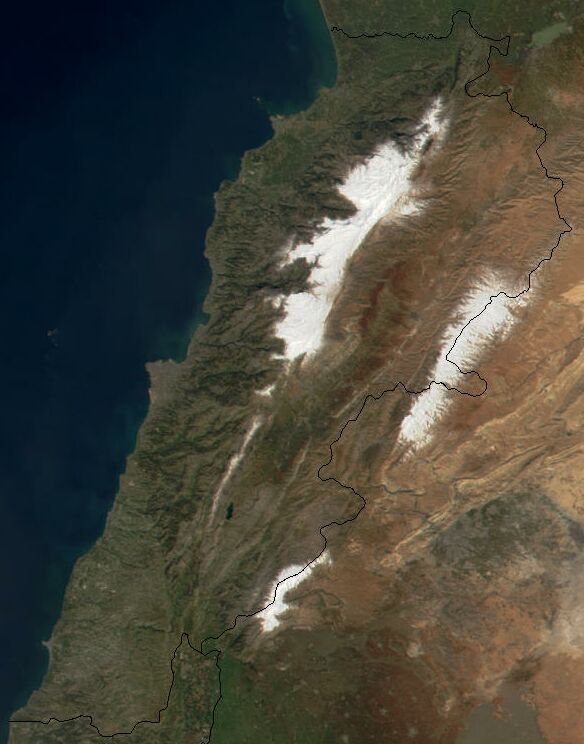
Lebanon from space. Snow cover can be seen on the western and eastern mountain ranges

- Total area ranked 166 out of 233 countries and outlying territories
- Renewable water resources ranked 145 out of 174 countries

== Military ==
- CIA World Factbook: Military expenditures ranked 78 out of 171 countries
- CIA World Factbook: Military expenditures ratio to GDP, ranked 45 out of 174 countries

== Politics ==
- Transparency International: Corruption Perceptions Index 2007, ranked 99 out of 179 countries
- Reporters Without Borders: World Press Freedom Index 2008, ranked 66 out of 173 countries
- The Economist EIU: Democracy Index 2008, ranked 89 out of 167 countries

== Technology ==
- World Intellectual Property Organization: Global Innovation Index 2026, ranked 86 out of 139 countries

== Tourism ==
Growth in tourism for 2009, Lebanon came first out of 165 countries examined by ( UNWTO ) with an increase of 60% from 2008.

== Transportation ==
- Motor vehicles per capita ranked 23 out of 140 countries
