= National symbols of Lebanon =

The national symbols of Lebanon reflect the country’s history, geography, and cultural identity. While some symbols are formally established in law, others have developed through long-standing tradition and public usage.

== Symbol ==
Title	Name of Symbol	
National Tree	The Cedar Tree	The most prominent national symbol of Lebanon is the Cedrus libani (Lebanese cedar). The cedar has been associated with Mount Lebanon since antiquity and appears in numerous historical and religious texts. It represents longevity, resilience, and continuity.
National flag	Flag of Lebanon	The national flag of Lebanon consists of two horizontal red stripes at the top and bottom, with a white band in the middle containing a green cedar tree. The red stripes are commonly interpreted as symbolizing the blood shed for independence, while the white represents peace and the snow of Lebanon’s mountains. The Lebanese flag (with cedar) was adopted by Parliament in 1943 during independence from the French Mandate.
Coat of Arms	Coat of Arms of Lebanon	Lebanon’s coat of arms features a cedar tree centered on a shield with red and white fields mirroring the national flag. It is used in official government documents, state institutions, and diplomatic contexts.
The National Anthem	National Anthem of Lebanon	The national anthem of Lebanon is Kulluna lil-Watan (“All of Us, for the Nation”). The lyrics were written by Rashid Nakhle and adopted in 1927 during the French Mandate period. The anthem emphasizes unity, sacrifice, and devotion to the homeland.
National flower	Lebanon Cyclamen (Cyclamen libanoticum)	Lebanon does not have a formally designated national flower established in law. However, the Cyclamen libanoticum, commonly known as the Lebanon cyclamen, is often regarded informally as the country’s national flower. Cyclamen libanoticum is endemic to Lebanon and grows primarily in mountainous regions. Its association with the country is based on its botanical specificity and symbolic connection to Lebanon’s natural landscape rather than formal legislative recognition.
National dish	Kibbeh	Lebanon does not have a single officially designated national dish established in law. However, Kibbeh (كبة) is widely regarded as the country’s national dish. Other dishes frequently associated with Lebanese culinary identity include Tabbouleh, Hummus, and Manakish, though none are legally designated as national dishes.
National bird		Lebanon does not have a formally designated national bird established in law.
National animal		Lebanon does not have a national animal designated by law.
