= Lebanese =

Lebanese may refer to:

- Something of, from, or related to Lebanon
- Lebanese people, people from Lebanon or of Lebanese descent
- Lebanese Arabic, the variety of Levantine Arabic spoken in Lebanon
- Lebanese culture
- Lebanese cuisine

== See also ==
- List of Lebanese people
