= List of World Heritage Sites in Lebanon =

Location of World Heritage Sites in Lebanon. Red dots represent cultural sites, while the purple dots represent sites of the Ouadi Qadisha (the Holy Valley) and the Forest of the Cedars of God (Horsh Arz el-Rab) and the yellow dots represent the Mount Amel Castles.

The United Nations Educational, Scientific and Cultural Organization (UNESCO) World Heritage Sites are places of importance to cultural or natural heritage as described in the UNESCO World Heritage Convention, established in 1972. Cultural heritage consists of monuments (such as architectural works, monumental sculptures, or inscriptions), groups of buildings, and sites (including archaeological sites). Natural features (consisting of physical and biological formations), geological and physiographical formations (including habitats of threatened species of animals and plants), and natural sites which are important from the point of view of science, conservation, or natural beauty, are defined as natural heritage. The Republic of Lebanon accepted the convention on 30 October 1990. There are seven World Heritage Sites in the country, with a further seven on the tentative list. It has served five terms on the World Heritage Committee

All of Lebanon's heritage sites are cultural. All but two of the World Heritage Sites in Lebanon were inscribed in 1984. Three sites are considered as in danger by UNESCO: the Rachid Karami International Fair-Tripoli, Tyre, and Mount Amel Castles; the third is also the most recently inscribed, in 2026.

== World Heritage Sites ==
UNESCO lists sites under ten criteria; each entry must meet at least one of the criteria. Criteria i through vi are cultural, and vii through x are natural.

† In danger

World Heritage Sites
Site	Image	Location (Governorate)	Year listed	UNESCO data	Description
Anjar	An arch with three columns in the middle	Beqaa Governorate	1984	293; iii, iv (cultural)	Established in the early 8th century, the city of Anjar was quickly abandoned following the fall of the Umayyad Caliphate, leaving behind ruins of walls, towers, palaces, mosques and baths, constituting an example of Umayyad period town-planning.
Baalbek	A now yellowed, hellenistic temple	Baalbek-Hermel Governorate	1984	294; i, iv (cultural)	Previously known as Heliopolis, the Phoenician city of Baalbek hosts some of the largest and best preserved Roman temples, including the Temples of Jupiter, Venus and Bacchus.
Byblos	A port with brick buildings in the back	Keserwan-Jbeil Governorate	1984	295; iii, iv, vi (cultural)	Continuously inhabited since the Neolithic Era, Byblos was one of the oldest cities of Phoenician origin. It has since witnessed Persian, Roman, Crusader and Ottoman occupation, each exerting influence upon its architecture. Byblos also played a significant role in the diffusion of the Phoenician alphabet.
Ouadi Qadisha (the Holy Valley) and the Forest of the Cedars of God (Horsh Arz el-Rab)	Some shrubs, with a town and mountains in the background	North Lebanon Governorate	1998	850; iii, iv, vi (cultural)	The isolated and rugged gorge of Ouadi Qadisha provides a refuge for some of the world's oldest Christian monasteries. The nearby Cedars of God is a remnant of the once-extensive cedar forests for which Lebanon has been famed since ancient times; their timber was prized for the construction of ships and temples across the Mediterranean.
Tyre†	Many broken marble columns	South Lebanon Governorate	1984	299; iii, vi (cultural)	The ancient Phoenician city of Tyre was one of the foremost maritime powers in the eastern Mediterranean and reportedly where purple dye was discovered. Extant archaeological remains mainly date back to Roman times, including baths, an arena, a colonnaded road, a triumphal arch, an aqueduct and a hippodrome. Tyre was recognized as endangered following Israeli strikes in 2026.
Rachid Karami International Fair-Tripoli†	Puddle of water on concrete, with an arch in the background	North Lebanon Governorate	2022	1702; ii, iv (cultural)	Located in northern Lebanon, the Rachid Karameh International Fair of Tripoli was designed in 1962 by the Brazilian architect Oscar Niemeyer on a 70-hectare site located between the historic centre of Tripoli and the Al Mina port. The fair was the flagship project of Lebanon's modernization policy in the 1960s. Now, it is threatened by lack of funds for maintenance due to the Lebanese liquidity crisis, urban development, and "its alarming state of conservation".
Mount Amel Castles†	A ruined stone castle on a hilltop	South Governorate	2026	1810; ii, iv (cultural)	These five castles, all built on high ridges, exemplify the cultural exchange that took place in the Near East. Also, they document the evolution of architecture for nine centuries, being used until the end of the 19th century, including the development of fortified architecture architecture during the Crusades. The first castle to be built was the Qalaat Al Chakif (also known as Beaufort Castle; pictured). Circa 1137 A.D., the King of Jerusalem constructed the aforementioned castle. It would be expanded upon by the Ayyubid, Mamluks and Al Saabi, the local feudal governors. It has been acclaimed as a well-preserved examples of a medieval castle in the near east. The remaining four castles, Qalaat Tibnin (Toron Castle), Qalaat Chakra (Dubieh Castle), Qalaat Deir Kifa (Maron Castle), and Qalaat Chama', were all built to be crusader posts in the early 12th century. The Qalaat Al Chakif, now partly ruined, underwent further construction by the Ayyubids, Mamluks and the Al Asgheir, local feudal governors. Furthermore, features from the Byzantine period to the late 19th century are also retained. In the case of Qalaat Tibnin, there is evidence of details from the Bronze Age.

== Tentative list ==
In addition to sites inscribed on the World Heritage List, member states can maintain a list of tentative sites that they may consider for nomination. Nominations for the World Heritage List are only accepted if the site was previously listed on the tentative list. Lebanon lists seven properties on its tentative list.

Tentative sites
Site	Image	Location (Governorate)	Year listed	UNESCO criteria	Description
Historic Centre of Saida (Note: This was originally called Centre historique de Saida on the UNESCO listing.)	Saida's brick sea castle, with a body of water separating the city seen in the back from it	South Governorate	2019	iii, iv (cultural)	Consisting of various medieval, and Ottoman buildings which are defended by two citadels, Saint Louis Castle, and Sidon Sea Castle, the historic centre of Saida is located 40 kilometres south of Beirut. The northern border is defined by a fishing port, it is bordered by a Tell in the south. Saida is the capital of the Southern Governate. Its name may have been derived from canaan, the eldest son of Noah. the Since the Chalcolithic period, it has been inhabited by a human populace. In the Brotherhood, an archaeological site southeast of Saida, a temple and bronze necropolis have been discovered.
Sacred Mount Hermon and its associated cultural monuments	Snowcapped Mount Hermon	Beqaa Governorate	2019	iii, iv (cultural)	Located in the south of the Beqaa border, in between Syria and Lebanon, it is reachable from Rachaya. Etymologically, the name is derived from the root "ḥrm", meaning sacred. In Arabic, it is called Jabal al-shaykh, literally meaning "mountain of the chief". Being the highest point on the eastern coast of the Mediterranean Sea, it rises to 2,814 metres (9,232 feet). The mountain has been considered as a sacred landmark by the Lebanese, it was mentioned in the Epic of Gilgamesh. Additionally, it was worshipped by the Romans. Under Moses and Joshua, it was the northwest bound of Israelite conquest. However, the first settlements date back to 200 BC. Mount Hermon was chosen by Jesus Christ to be the location of his transfiguration. In the Bible, it goes by a number of names: such as Hermon, by the Caananite worshipers of Baal in the Books of Kings; Sirion, by the Phoenicians; and Senir, by the Amorites. After 200 B.C., it was occupied by the Seleucids. Soon after, the Ituraeans created a principality in the area, which dissolved after the fall of Chalcis. After dissolution, the mountain came under the control of Agrippa I and Agrippa II, both of the Herodian dynasty. A joint control was established between the cities of Damascus, Sidon and Paneas after the end of the first century A.D. The site was inhabited continuously until the third century. Upon the summit sits an ancient temple. Qasr Antar, as it is known today, is, and was, the highest temple of the ancient world. There are various Greek-inscribed temples dating from 300 A.D. Upwards of 30 temples and shrines has been found in and around Mount Hermon, adding to its historical significance. Besides being a sacred place for the Christian and Muslim community, it is also important for the Druze. The two major sources of the Jordan River lie at its foot.
Ras al-Qalaat promontory / Ras Al Natour promontory / Ras el-Mlelih Promontory		North Governorate	2019	iii, v (cultural)	
Temple of Eshmun (Note: This was originally called Temple d’Echmoun on the UNESCO listing.)	A broken, marble throne	South Governorate	2019	iii, iv (cultural)	
The Ancient City of Tripoli (Note: This was originally called L’ancienne ville de Tripoli on the UNESCO listing.)		North Governorate	2019	iv (cultural)	
The Archealogical Site of Nahr el-Kalb (Note: This was originally called Le site archeologique de Nahr el-Kalb on the UNESCO listing.)	A side of a cliff	Keserwan-Jbeil Governorate	2019	iii, vi (cultural)	
The Historic Centre of the City of Batroun (Note: This was originally called Le centre historique de la ville de Batroun on the UNESCO listing.)	The port at the old city of Batroun with the St. Stephens Church in the background	North Governorate	2019	iv, v (cultural)	On Lebanon's coast, Batroun lies on a rocky promontory. It is located approximately 54 kilometres north of Beirut and has an area of 4.68 km^{2}. It has been continuously inhabited since the Bronze Age. It has been part of Assyria, Macedon, Seleucids, Iturea, Banu Ammar, Mamluks and crusader states. The major historic buildings and the ancient souk of Batroun that can be seen today are built of sandstone quarried in the city. This is because of the city being rebuilt in the mid-19th century. The stores of the old souk open onto alleyways through doors topped with low arches. The houses above the stores open onto the same alleyways through balconies suspended on stone or wooden corbels.
The collection of historical monuments and natural sites in the village of Menjez		Akkar Governorate	2019	iii, iv (cultural)	The Menjez megalithic complex is the largest site in the area; it comprised 87 tombs in the 1960s when Father M. Tallon excavated them, yet only about fifty remained during recent work conducted by the University of Geneva in partnership with the Château-Musée de Bélesta, the Museum of Lebanese Prehistory, and the municipality of Menjez. More than 200 standing stones were observed across the 11 tombs cleared during the heritage enhancement campaign; these stones form the circular or quadrangular burial chambers. Some of them feature engravings and, in all likelihood, traces of paint. The funerary monuments are grouped in clusters of seven or eight and are situated on the slopes of the watercourses that shape the landscape around the village of Menjez: Wadi Fazaa, Wadi Menjez, and Nahr el-Kebir. It is one of the few sites in the Akkar region preserved from the recent prehistoric period (4th and 3rd millennia BCE).

== See also ==
- List of World Heritage Sites in the Arab states
