= Pseudophoxinus libani =

Conservation status
- Least Concern (IUCN 3.1)

Scientific classification
- Kingdom: Animalia
- Phylum: Chordata
- Class: Actinopterygii
- Order: Cypriniformes
- Family: Leuciscidae
- Subfamily: Leuciscinae
- Genus: Pseudophoxinus
- Species: P. libani

Binomial name
- Pseudophoxinus libani (Lortet, 1883)

Synonyms
- Phoxinellus libani Lortet, 1883

Species of fish

Pseudophoxinus libani, also known as the Levantine minnow, is a species of freshwater ray-finned fish belonging to the family Leuciscidae, which includes the daces, Eurasian minnows and related species. It is the only endemic fish of Lebanon.

It was originally reported in the upper Orontes River by Louis Charles Émile Lortet in 1883. It was considered extinct in 1996 but was found again in 2001, alive and well, swimming around in Lake Yammoune in the Yammoune nature reserve near Yammoune village. Its natural habitats are rivers and inland karsts.) It is potentially affected by overfishing. The Orontes minnow is sometimes considered conspecific by some taxonomic authorities.
