= Yammoune =

Yammoune Yammouneh, El Yammoûné
- Village
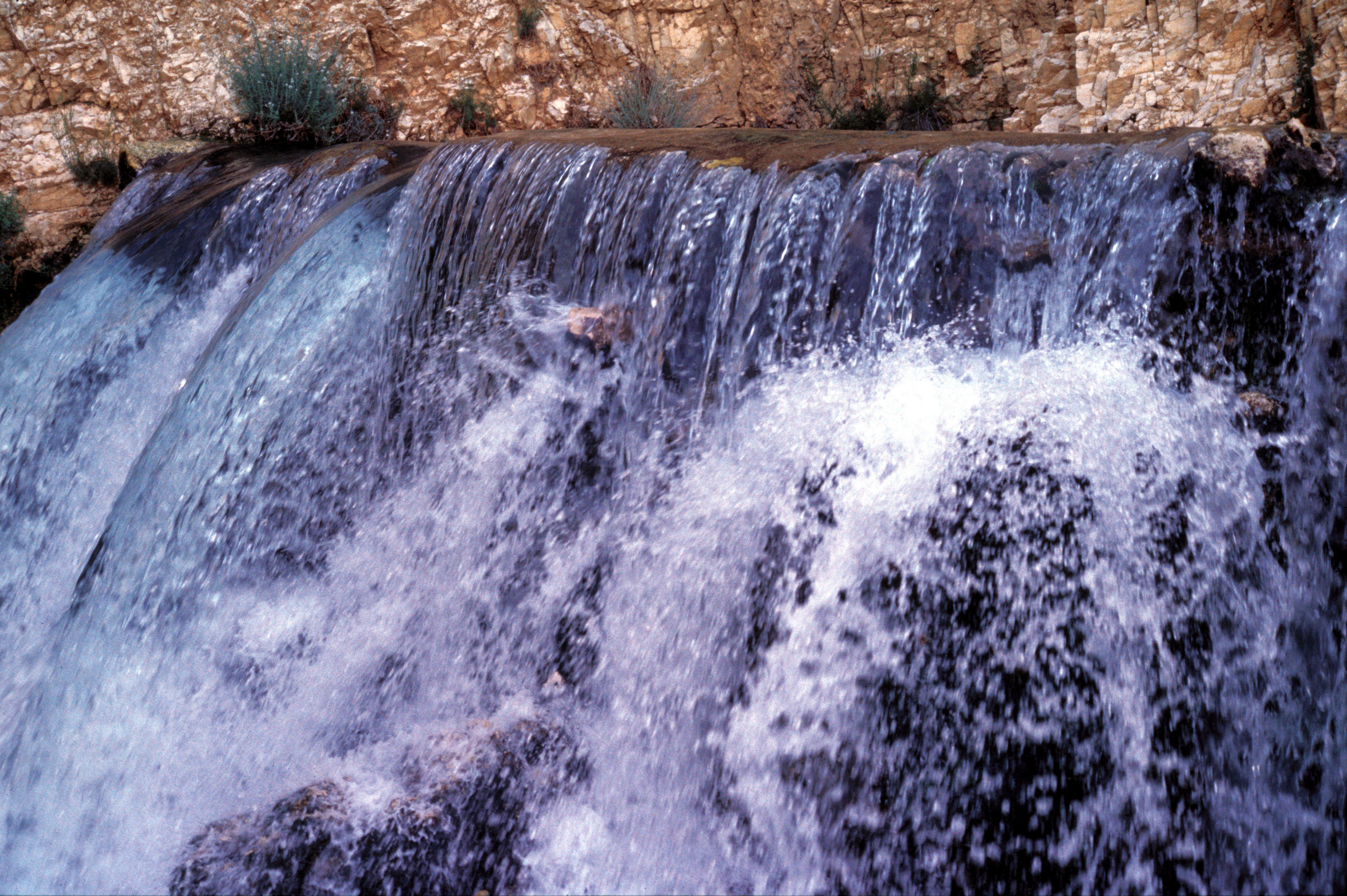
- The Naba al-Arbain spring of Yammoune
- Interactive map of Yammoune
- Country: Lebanon
- Governorate: Baalbek-Hermel
- District: Baalbek
- Elevation: 4,495 ft (1,370 m)

Population (2021)
  - Total: 7,000

Yammoune
- Location within Lebanon
- 34.133333°N 36.016667°E
- Cultures: Roman, Ancient Greece, Phoenicia
- Location: 25 kilometres (16 mi) northwest of Baalbek
- Region: Baalbek

Site notes
- Condition: Ruins
- Public access: Yes

Yammoune is a lake, nature reserve, village and municipality situated 27 kilometres (17 mi) northwest of Baalbek in Baalbek District, Baalbek-Hermel Governorate, Lebanon. The village had a few hundred inhabitants in 1955.

== Ancient Roman temple ==
There are the ruins of a Roman temple (possibly with Phoenician-Greek origins) in the village that are included in a grouping of Roman Temples of the Beqaa Valley. It is said to be dedicated to Venus (or possibly also Astarte, before the Roman era in the region). Part of two enclosure walls and the temple foundations remain intact. Many inscriptions, written in Latin were found at the temple site. A few Ancient Greek inscriptions were also found. It is considered likely to be initially very small and of Phoenician origin, but it was greatly enlarged and improved by the Romans

All that remains of the Roman temple today is a retaining wall of limestone blocks which goes down to the lake level. Beneath are supposed to be subterranean chambers. Presumably dedicated to Venus-Astrate, legend has it that when Typhon made war against the heavens, it was at Yammouneh that Venus changed herself into a fish...A great water cavern west of the temple fills the lake each year, although at other times it may appear almost dry. Luxurious Roman villas used to occupy the area between the cavern and the temple and numerous altars, statues and other elements have been discovered nearby.

Ernest Renan visited the site and discovered sections of a frieze and parts of pediment attributed to the temple. A partly broken cockle shell with a figure of a goddess with outstretched arms was also found recently during ploughing by a tractor. The ancient name of Yammoune is not known however some have suggested that it was once the location of a Festival of Adonis.

The temple is situated on a hill, approximately 300 metres (980 ft) from the main spring in the area, the Naba al-Arbain. It lies next to the lake where it is considered ancient worshippers took pilgrimage from the temple at Afqa to purify themselves in the temple waters. Michael Alouf found a statue of Adonis in the temple, carrying an ear of corn in one hand and a quiver and a lamb in the other. He stored the statue at a museum he founded in the ruins of Baalbek.

Alouf also found a Roman road measuring 200 metres (0.12 mi), located 2 kilometres (1.2 mi) southeast of the lake. He also found another square building measuring approximately 12 square metres (130 ft^{2}) next to this road. The building was constructed of large stones and an Ancient Greek inscription was found inside. He considered it an ancient guardhouse or watchtower for protection of travellers. He suggested that oracles were consulted at the temple in connection with Queen Zenobia, who legend tells, sent offerings to the goddess by placing them on the lake. If the offerings sunk to the floor of the lake, then the goddess had accepted them. If the offerings floated, then they had been rejected and gave a bad omen to Palmyra and the surrounding lands.

Eusebius records that the Emperor Constantine destroyed a temple of Venus 'on the summit of Mount Lebanon.' and probably it was this pagan temple dedicated to Venus.

During the 1970s Ali Akbar Mohtashamipur lived in Yammoune whilst receiving military training at a Fatah camp. He later held a number of senior posts in the Iranian government. He wrote about the village “Their men are courageous and mostly armed ... They don’t submit to government authority and don’t pay for water and electricity. They have fought several times with neighbouring Christian villages and have won. They like the [Shiite] clergy.”

== Geology ==
The village lies on the Yammoune Fault line, a geological fault responsible for several historical earthquakes in the area. A new section of the fault was discovered in 2010 by Ata Elias of the American University of Beirut. They studied samples from a trench in Marjahine to improve dating on historical earthquakes and better predict future ones.

== Lake Yammoune ==
Lake Yammoune is home to Lebanon's only endemic fish, Pseudophoxinus libani. In Phoenician Mythology, the goddess Astarte turned herself into a golden fish in Yammoune lake to escape from the vengeance of Adonis's wrathful brother Typhon.

The lake is filled from a water cavern to the west of the temple has only one outflow, through a big hole and Robert Boulanger suggested that it might dry up entirely at the end of summer. The valley of Ouyoun Ergush leads from Yammoune towards Marjhine.

A network of rock-cut irrigation channels and watercourses lead from Lake Yammoune to provide irrigation for the region of the Beqaa Valley around Baalbek.

== Possible early sanctuary of El ==
Marvin H. Pope identified the home of El in the Ugaritic texts of ca. 1200 BCE, described as "at the source[s] of the [two] rivers, in the midst of the fountains of the [two] deeps", with this lake and Afqa, source of the river Adonis on the other side of the mountain, which Pope said was closely associated with it in legend.

== Yammoune nature reserve ==
The area has been classed as a scientific and cultural nature reserve since 1998 and is known for distinguishing juniper trees. The area is popular as a hiking trail.
