= Cedar =

Cedar may refer to:

== Trees and plants ==
- Cedrus, common English name cedar, an Old-World genus of coniferous trees in the plant family Pinaceae
- Cedar (plant), a list of trees and plants known as cedar

== Places ==
=== United States ===
- Cedar, Arizona
- Cedar, Indiana
- Cedar, Iowa
- Cedar, Kansas
- Cedar, Michigan
- Cedar, Minnesota, a community Oak Grove, Anoka County
- Cedar City, Utah
- Cedar, Mingo County, West Virginia
- Cedar, Raleigh County, West Virginia
- Cedar, Wisconsin, an unincorporated community
- Cedar County (disambiguation), multiple counties
- Cedar Township (disambiguation), multiple townships
- Cedar Station, Texas

=== Elsewhere ===
- Cedar, British Columbia, Canada
- Cedars of God, Lebanon, an ancient Cedrus libani forest and reserve, inscribed on UNESCO's list of World Heritage Sites

== Ships ==
- SS Cedar, a Panamanian coastal trading vessel in service from 1955 to 1958
- USLHT Cedar, a United States Lighthouse Service lighthouse tender in commission in 1917 and from 1919 to 1939 which also saw service as:
  - the United States Navy patrol vessel USS Cedar, in commission from 1917 to 1919
  - the United States Coast Guard lighthouse tender USCGC Cedar (WAGL-207), in commission from 1939 to 1950

== Other ==
- Cedar!, 1967 debut album by pianist Cedar Walton
- Cedar (Doves album), a 1998 extended play recording by Doves
- Cedar (name), a list of people and characters with the name
- Cedar (programming environment), an interpreted programming system developed at Xerox PARC
- Cedar Girls' Secondary School, Singapore
- Center of Excellence for Document Analysis and Recognition (CEDAR), a research laboratory at SUNY, Buffalo, New York, US
- Sony Ericsson Cedar, a mobile phone produced by Sony Ericsson
- Cedar College, a Reception to Year 12 Christian School in Adelaide, South Australia

== See also ==
- Cedars (disambiguation)
- The Cedars (disambiguation)
- Cedar Creek (disambiguation)
- Cedar Forest, the realm of the gods in Mesopotamian mythology
- Cedar Grove (disambiguation)
- Cedar Hall (disambiguation)
- Cedar Lake (disambiguation)
- Cedar Park (disambiguation)
- Cedar River (disambiguation)
- Cedarvale (disambiguation)
