= The Cedars =

The Cedars may refer to:

== Places ==
=== United Kingdom ===
- The Cedars, Sunninghill, a Grade II listed house in Sunninghill, Berkshire

=== United States ===
- Former name of Kimberly, Wisconsin
- The Cedars (Sonoma County, California), serpentine canyon and ecological preserve
- The Cedars (Columbus, Georgia), listed on the National Register of Historic Places (NRHP) in Muscogee County
- The Cedars (Washington, Georgia), NRHP-listed in Wilkes County
- The Cedars (Franklin, Kentucky), NRHP-listed in Simpson County
- The Cedars (Leitchfield, Kentucky), NRHP-listed in Grayson County
- The Cedars (Clinton, Mississippi), NRHP-listed in Hinds County
- The Cedars (Columbus, Mississippi), NRHP-listed in Lowndes County
- The Cedars (Starkville, Mississippi), NRHP-listed in Oktibbeha County
- The Cedars (Hendersonville, North Carolina), NRHP-listed in Henderson County
- The Cedars (Murfreesboro, North Carolina), NRHP-listed in Hertford County
- The Cedars (Beech Island, South Carolina), NRHP-listed in South Carolina
- The Cedars (Jackson, Tennessee), NRHP-listed in Madison County
- The Cedars (Dallas, Texas), a historic neighborhood in Dallas
- The Cedars (Greenwood, Virginia), NRHP-listed in Albemarle County
- The Cedars (Arlington, VA), US lobbying headquarters for The Fellowship (Christian organization)

== Other ==
- "The Cedars", home of South Australian painter Hans Heysen, a tourist attraction
- The Cedars Academy, a secondary school in Birstall, Leicestershire, England
- The Cedars School, an independent school in Croydon, Greater London, England
- The Cedars, a name for Cedars of God area in Lebanon
- Battle of the Cedars (1776), American Revolutionary War skirmish
- Les Cèdres, Quebec, location of the above skirmish
- Guardians of the Cedars, Lebanese political party
- Trail of the Cedars, Glacier National Park, Montana
- Treaty of the Cedars (1836), Wisconsin

== See also ==
- Cedars (disambiguation)
- Cedar (disambiguation)
