= Skiing in Lebanon =

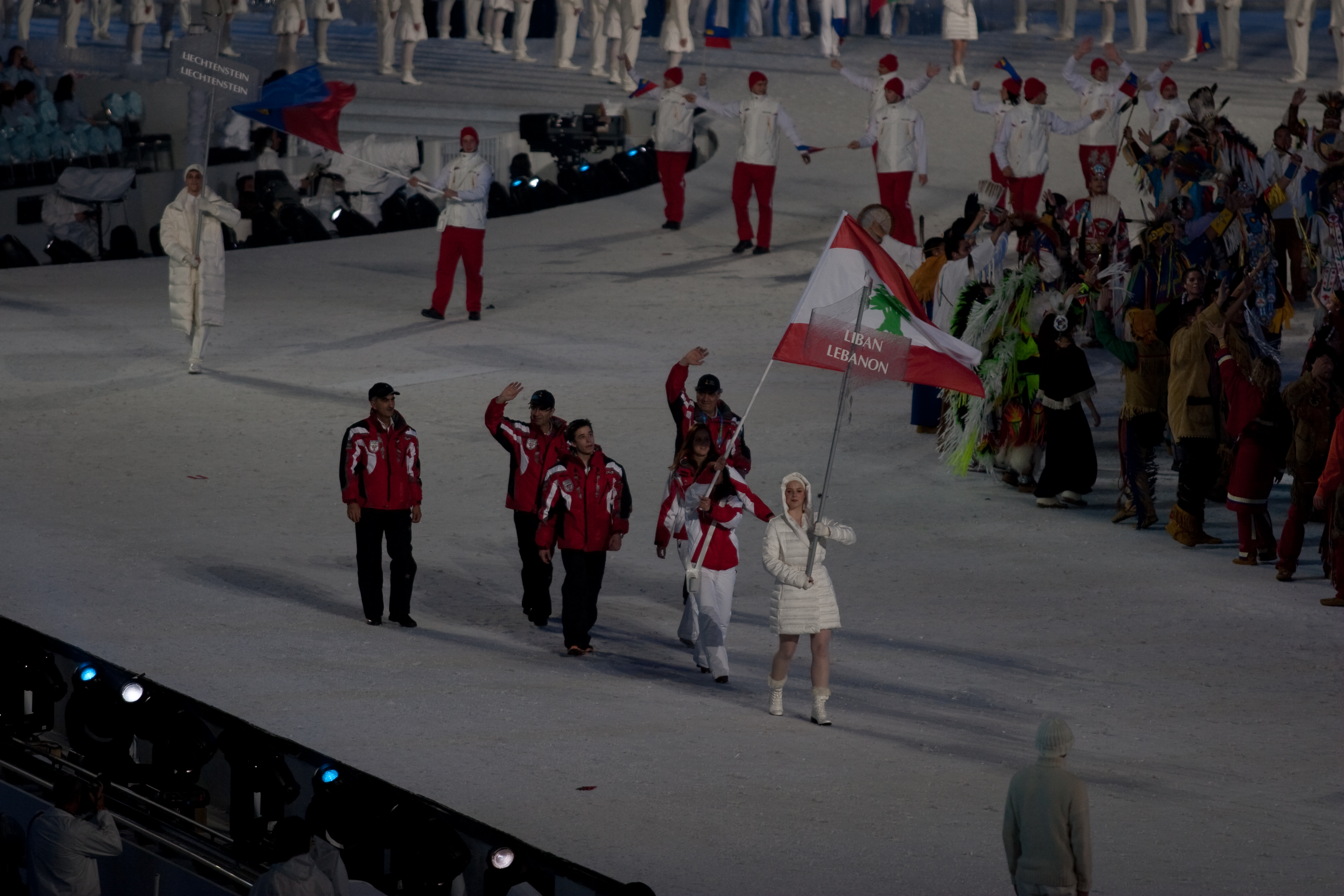
Lebanon at the 2010 Winter Olympics

Skiing in Lebanon has been a sport since an engineering student returning from studying in Switzerland brought back with him the sport of skiing to Lebanon in the early twentieth century. Lebanon is home to six developed ski resorts. Cedars Ski Resort Bsharri is the oldest and received its first ski lift. Mzaar Ski Resort, Kfardebian, is Lebanon's largest ski resort.

== Overview ==
Lebanon, a mountainous country with summits reaching heights of over 3,000 metres (10,000 feet), is sometimes referred to as the "Switzerland of the East".

Lebanon is home to six well-maintained ski resorts on the Mount Lebanon range that faces the Mediterranean. They have a combined 49 ski lifts with pistes totaling 300 km in length.

Lebanon's ski resorts are accessible on a day trip with the nearest ski resorts less than an hour's drive from the capital, Beirut. The après-ski scene in Lebanon is often seen as a crucial part of skiing, and is hence very enjoyable and memorable. A seventh ski field, a steep and rugged one that is suitable for the most intrepid skiers only, is at Mount Hermon, but due to the political situation with Israel and Syria, the field has never been developed into a resort. In 2005, plans for a US$1 billion skiing resort, Sannine Zenith, were revealed.

== History ==
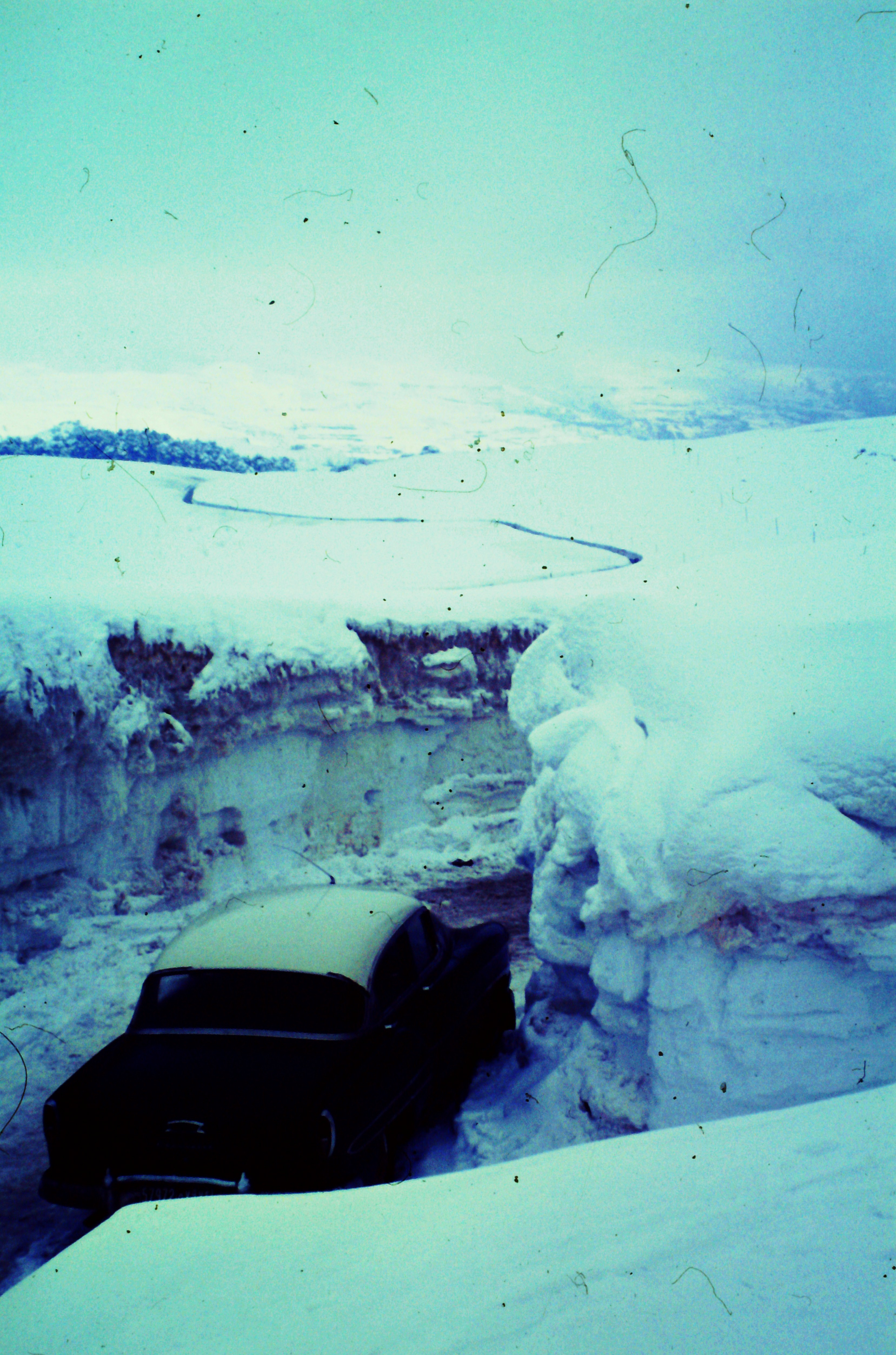
Winter in the Anti-Lebanon Mountains

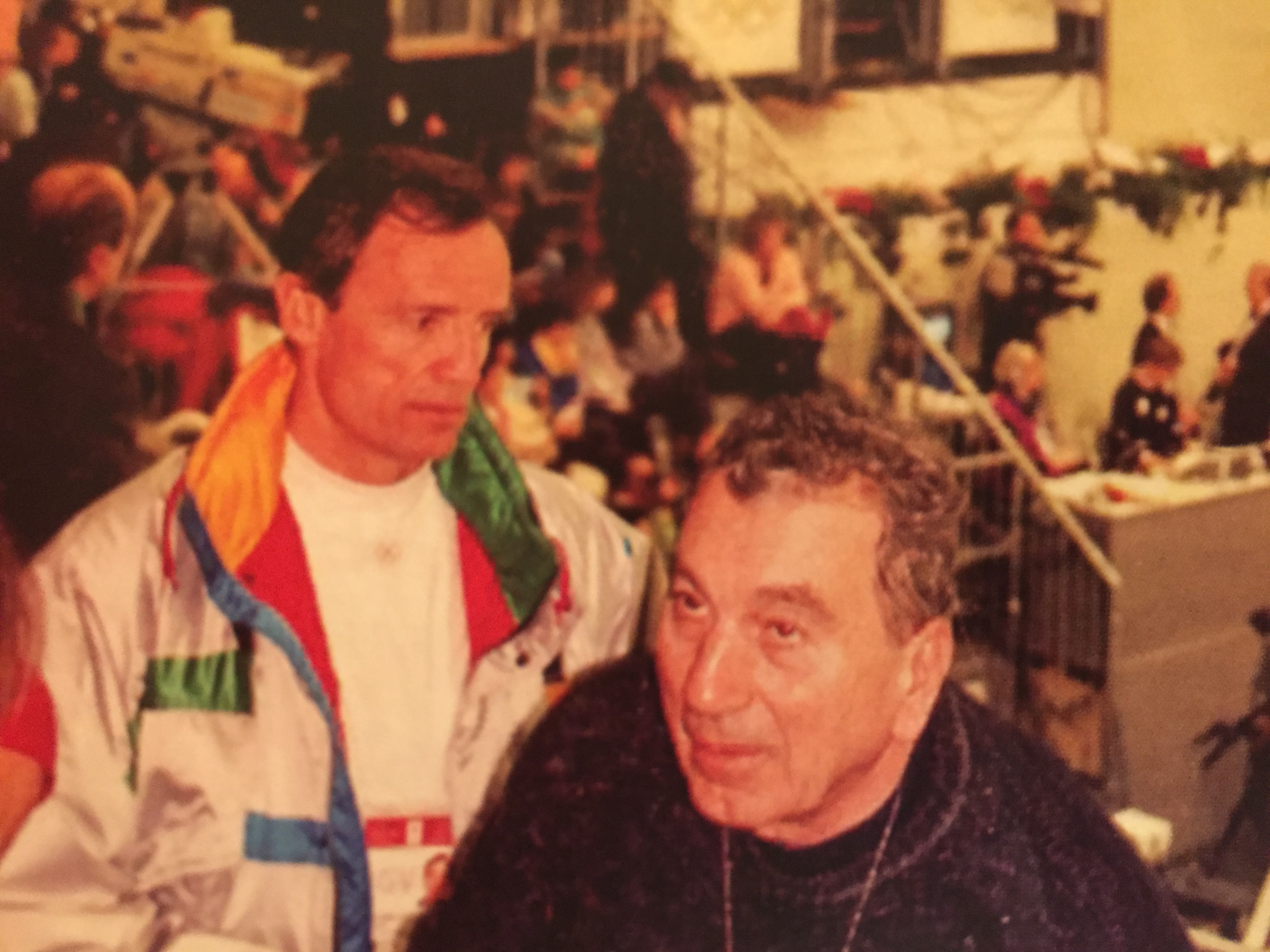
Pr. Emile Riachi and Jean-Claude Killy - 1992 Winter olympic games in Albertville

Skiing was introduced to Lebanon in 1913 when Ramez Ghazzoui, a Lebanese engineer, returned from his studies in Switzerland and introduced his friends to the sport in the mountains near Aley in Mount Lebanon.

In 1934, Le Club Libanais, the first ski club in Lebanon, was founded by Mauritius Tabet, Mounir Itani, and sisters Andrée Khasho and Aimée Kettaneh. The following year, the French Army established the first ski school at Le Grand Cèdre hotel at the Cedars of God in Bsharri northern Lebanon. In 1937, the school moved to a high mountain barracks, and would later become known as the Military Ski School.

By the 1940s, Lebanon had established competitions, clubs, and ski schools throughout the country, and began competing at an international level. James Riddell, a British champion skier who was often called the Father of Modern Ski Journalism, administered in 1942 a ski and mountaineering school for the Australian 9th Army at the Cedars of God Bsharri .

In 1947, Lebanon competed for the first time at the international championship in Chamonix, France, with Michel Samen carrying the Lebanese flag. One year later, Lebanon competed in the Winter Olympic Games for the first time at the 1948 Winter Olympics in St. Moritz, Switzerland.

In 1959, the resort of Oyoune el Simane known today as Mzaar Kfardebian was started From 1962 until the eruption of the civil war in 1975, a World Cup Competition named “Semaine Internationale du Ski aux Cedres” took place yearly in The Cedars and attracted the world's most prestigious champions

In 1967 and up until 1972 the federation cooperated with the Lebanese Army to host the World Championship of Military Ski.

At the time of its construction in 1974, Faqra Club, which was built at the foot of Mount Sannine with the help of Swiss architects, was one of the premier private skiing resorts in the world. With altitudes ranging between 1700 and 2000 meters, the resort offered a dozen pistes of varying levels that permitted skiers to enjoy the sport day and night. On clear days, one could see the Mediterranean and the capital, Beirut, from the summits.

In 1993, a Lebanese-American, Richard Elias initiated the International Peace Ski, in which he led a group of thirteen professional skiers from ten different countries to ski in Lebanon.

Lebanese skiers have participated in the Winter Olympic Games since 1948 and in World Championships: Innsbruck (1964), Greece (1967), Sapporo (1972), Innsbruck (1976), Grenoble (1969), Lake Placid (1980), Calgary (1988) and Albertville (1992).

== Ski resorts ==
- Faqra
- Laqlouq also written Laklouk
- Zaarour
- Qanat Bakish
- Mzaar Kfardebian
- Cedars Ski Resort

== Season ==
The ski season, which is similar to the Alps, typically runs from mid-December to April, depending on the length and depth of snowfall. In spring, it is sometimes possible to snow ski in the morning and drive to the coast in the afternoon to water ski.

== See also ==
- Lebanon at the 2010 Winter Olympics
- Sport in Lebanon
- Cedars of God
- Mzaar Kfardebian
