= Cedars Ski Resort =

Resort in north Lebanon

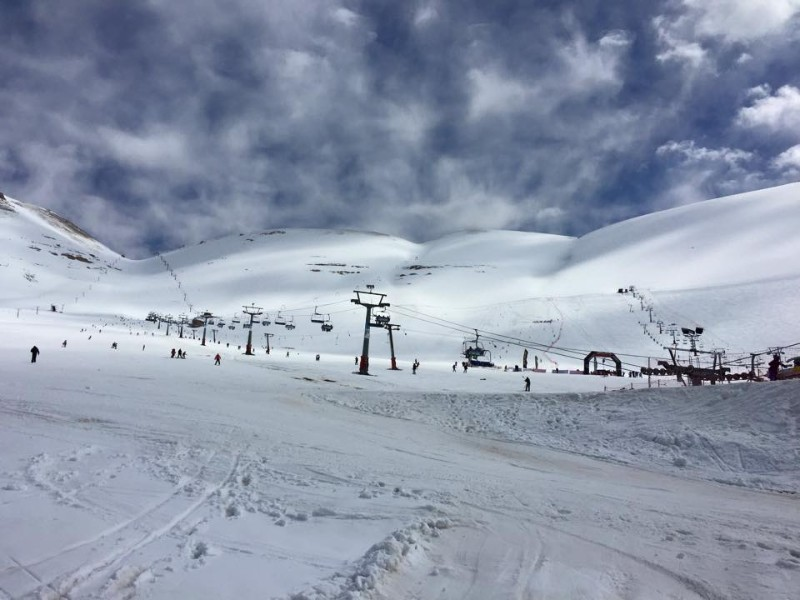
Cedars Ski Resort Bsharri

Cedars Ski Resort Bsharri (Arabic: منتجع الأرز للتزلج) is a ski resort located in the Bsharri mountains of north Lebanon. The natural area known as Cedars of God is nearby. Ariz (or Arz) means cedar in Arabic, and is sometimes used to refer to the area. It is Lebanon's oldest ski area and home to Lebanon's first ski lift, built in 1953. The resort is about a two-hour drive and 130 km (81 mi) from Beirut. It is at Bcharreh mountain.

== See also ==
- Skiing in Lebanon
