= Chalet =

Type of building or house, native to the Alpine region

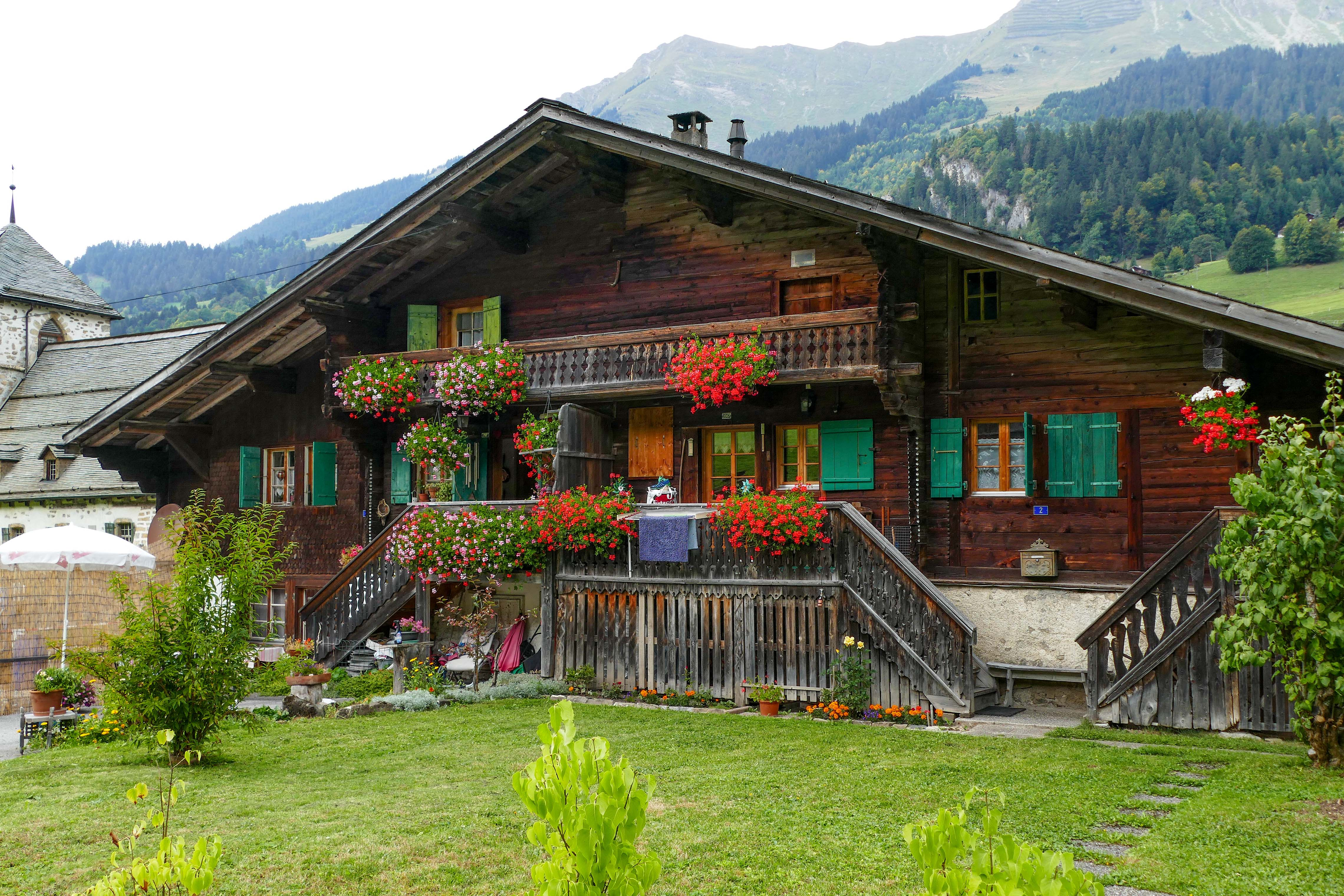
A typical chalet in the Swiss Alps

A chalet (pronounced /ˈʃæleɪ/ SHAL-ay in British English; in American English usually /ʃæˈleɪ/ shal-AY), also called Swiss chalet, is a type of building or house, typical of the Alpine region in Europe. It is made of wood, with a heavy, gently sloping roof and wide, well-supported eaves set at right angles to the front of the house.

== Definition and origin ==
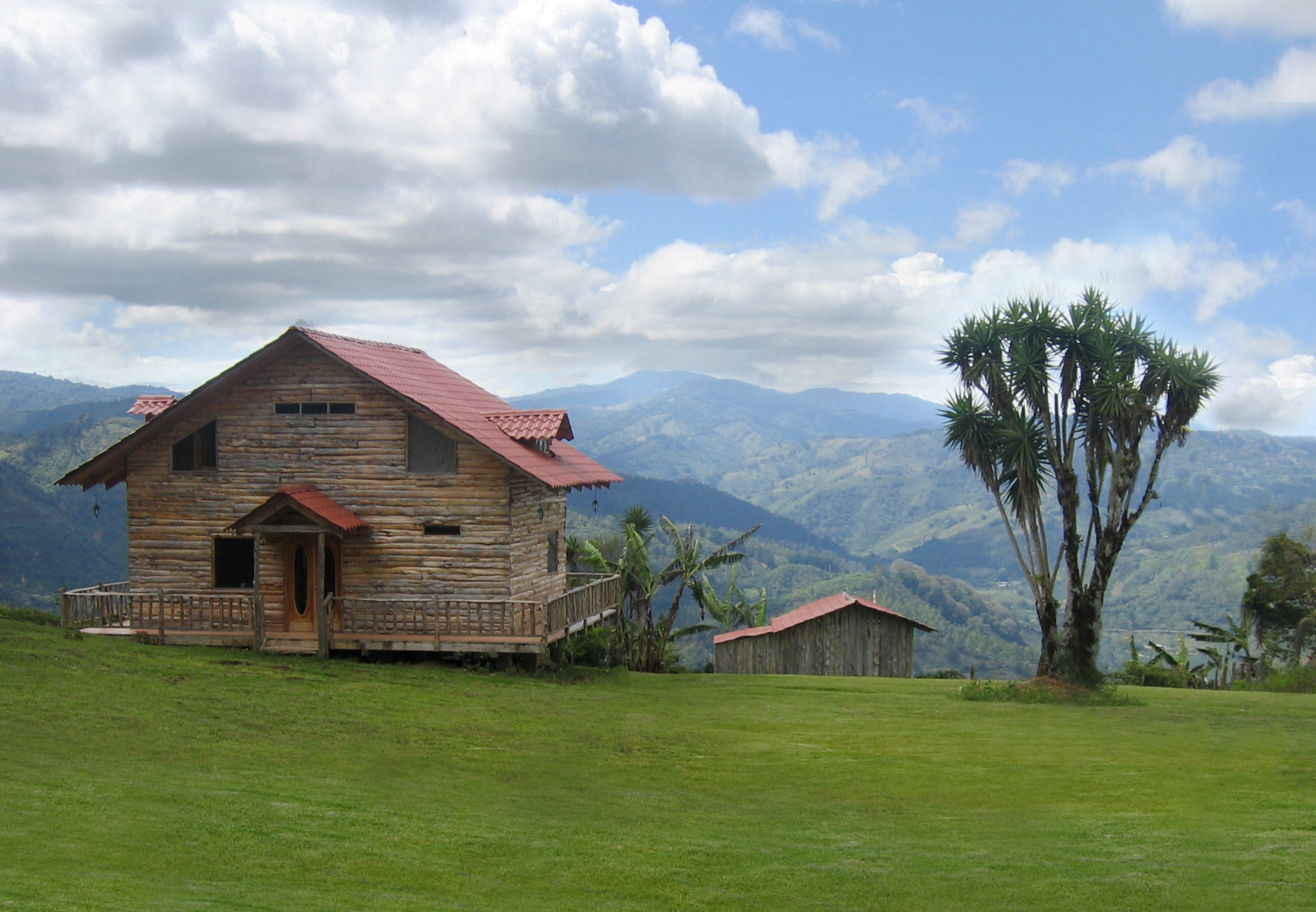
A 'chalet' in the hills to the east of Orosí, Costa Rica

The term chalet comes from the Arpitan-speaking part of Switzerland and the French Savoy region, and originally referred to the hut of a herder. It was often embedded in the ground for the sake of temperature buffering.

Many chalets in the European Alps were originally used as seasonal farms for dairy cattle, which would be brought up from the lowland pastures during the summer months. The herders would live in the chalet and make butter and cheese in order to preserve the milk produced. These products would then be taken, with the cattle, back to the low valleys before the onset of the alpine winter. The chalets would remain locked and unused during the winter months. Around many chalets there are small windowless huts called mazots which were used to lock away valuable items for this period.

=== The Grand Chalet ===
The largest and grandest historic chalet in Switzerland is the Grand Chalet in Rossinière. The chalet is considered one of the largest wooden houses in the Alps. The Grand Chalet was built between 1752 and 1756 for Jean-David Henchoz (1712–1758), known as the Cheese Baron. The chalet became famous as the last residence of the painter Balthus.

== Modern international usage ==
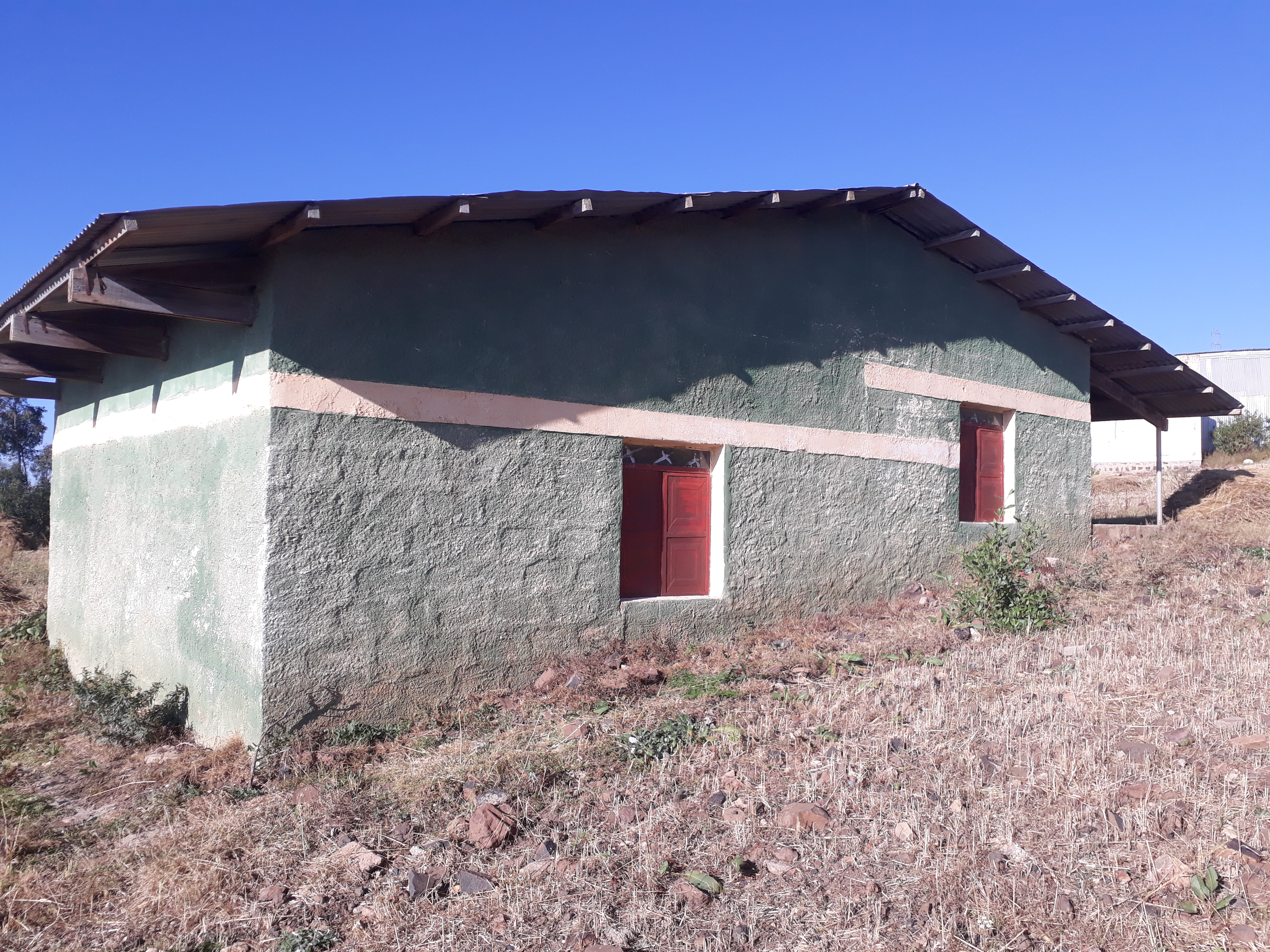
Chalet-style house built by Swiss nurse Ruth Trummer in Hagere Selam (Ethiopia) around 1970

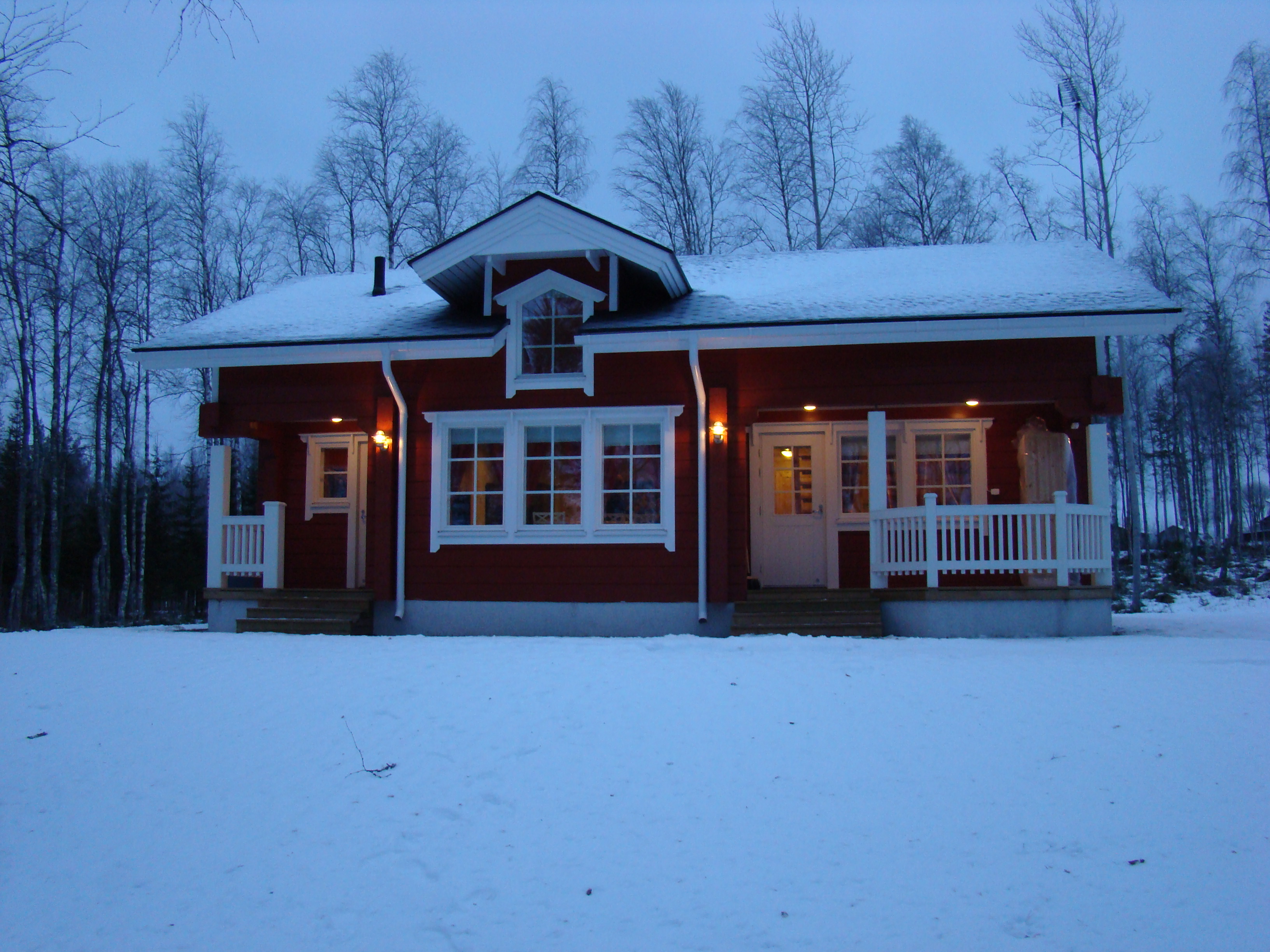
The Silver Beach chalet in Ranua, Finland in December 2007

With the emergence of the Alpine travel business, chalets were transformed into holiday homes used by ski and hiking enthusiasts. Over the years, the term 'chalet' changed to be applied generally to holiday homes, whether built in a strictly Alpine style or not. In Quebec French, any summer or holiday dwelling, especially near a ski hill, is called a chalet whether or not it is built in the style of a Swiss chalet; English-speaking Quebecers have adopted the term as well.

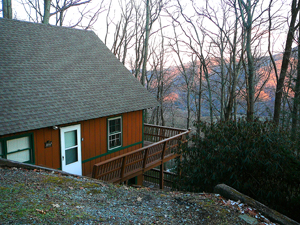
A holiday 'chalet' in the Blue Ridge Mountains

Nowadays, in North America and elsewhere in the world, the use of the word chalet can refer to more than just a mountain location. The term chalet is even used to describe resort-like homes or residential properties located by the beach. For example, in Lebanon a chalet usually refers to holiday homes at one of the six Lebanese ski resorts, but the term can also refer to a beach cabin at seaside resorts. In North American ski areas, the word chalet is also used to describe buildings that house cafeterias and other services provided to the tourist, even though they may not resemble a traditional Alpine chalet. In the United States, Alpine ski chalets are gaining popularity in Colorado and the Rocky Mountain region during winter months. Most ski chalets are privately owned vacation homes that owners visit two to three times per year and rent out the remaining time. Owners of these ski chalets often hire property management companies to manage and rent their property.

In the Levant, Egypt, and Kuwait and in the Italian region of Marche, chalets refer to beach houses, rather than mountainside homes, and built in any style of architecture.

In Britain, the word chalet was used for basic sleeping accommodation at holiday camps built around the mid-20th century.

The 'chalet' ski holiday was popularised by the British in the 1980s, led by companies such as Ski West, John Morgan and Supertravel. Bladon Lines were the leading 'chalet company' but a combination of Brexit and the pandemic has resulted in few chalets still being offered to British skiers.

== See also ==
- American Craftsman
- Cottage
- Mar del Plata style
- Swiss chalet style
- Vernacular architecture

== Bibliography ==
- Dana, William Sumner Barton (1913), The Swiss Chalet Book; A Minute Analysis and Reproduction of the Chalets of Switzwerland, Obtained by a Special Visit to That Country, Its Architects, and Its Chalet Homes (reprinted 2009 by Nabu Press) ISBN 978-1-172-29267-7
- Galindo, Michelle (2009), Chalet Architecture and Design, Braun Architecture AG ISBN 3-03768-021-0
