= Cedar Park =

Cedar Park may refer to:

- Cedar Park (Galesville, Maryland), listed on the NRHP in Anne Arundel County, Maryland
- Cedar Park, Philadelphia, a neighborhood in Philadelphia, Pennsylvania
- Cedar Park, Seattle, a neighborhood in Seattle, Washington
- Cedar Park, Texas, a city located in Williamson County, Texas
- Cedar Park, Wisconsin, an unincorporated community
- Cedar Park Center, a concert venue and sports arena, in Cedar Park, Texas
- Cedar Park station (Exo), a commuter rail station on the RTM Vaudreuil–Hudson line in Pointe-Claire, Quebec, Canada
- Melrose/Cedar Park (MBTA station), a commuter rail station in Melrose, Massachusetts
- Cedar Park, a city park in Chicago

== See also ==
- Cedar (disambiguation)
