= Cedar Hall =

Cedar Hall may refer to:

- Cedar Hall, Maryland
- Cedar Hall, an alternative name for Hillcrest
- Cedar Hall, a Gilded Age mansion in Hampton, Virginia built by seafood magnate James Sands Darling in 1906.

== See also ==
- Cedar (disambiguation)
