= Cedarvale =

Cedarvale or Cedar Vale may refer to:

- Cedarvale, dude ranch in Montana, United States
- Cedarvale, New Mexico, United States
- Cedarvale, Texas, United States
- Cedar Vale, Kansas, United States
- Cedar Vale, Queensland, Australia
- Cedarvale, British Columbia, Canada
- Cedarvale station (British Columbia)
- Cedarvale station, subway and light-rail station in Toronto
- Cedarvale Park (Toronto)
- Cedarvale, Toronto, Ontario, a neighbourhood

== See also ==
- Cedar (disambiguation)
