= Cedars =

Cedars may refer to:

- Cedar (plant), including a list of trees and plants known as cedar
- Cedars (album), an album released in 2003 by English band Clearlake
- Cedars (immigration detention), facility in the UK
- Cedars-Sinai Medical Center, Los Angeles, California
- Cedars, Pennsylvania
- Cedars, Dallas, Texas, a neighborhood
- Cedars Hospital, on the soap opera Guiding Light
- The Cedars, nickname of the Lebanon national rugby league team
- The Cedars, a mansion in Washington, D.C.

== See also ==
- Cedar (disambiguation)
- The Cedars (disambiguation)
