= Sony Ericsson Naite =

Mobile phone model

Sony Ericsson J105 Naite
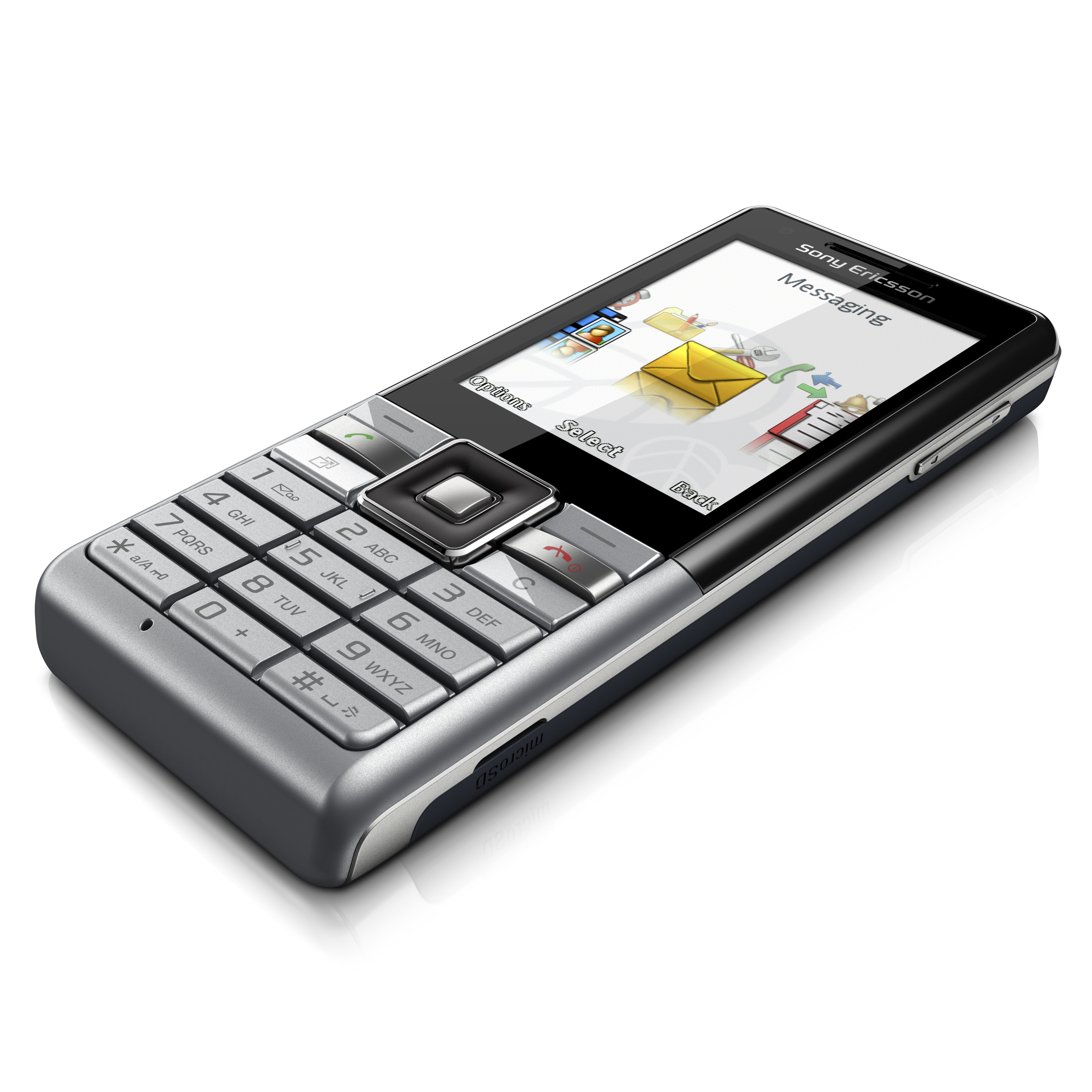
- Manufacturer: Sony Ericsson
- Series: J
- Availability by region: October 2009
- Successor: Sony Ericsson Cedar
- Form factor: Candybar
- Dimensions: 108×47×12.6 mm (4.25×1.85×0.50 in)
- Weight: 84 g
- Memory: 100 MB (internal)
- Removable storage: microSD, expandable up to 8 GB
- Battery: Li-Po (BST-33) (950 mAh)
- Rear camera: 2 MP, 1600×1200 pixels
- Front camera: (VGA) Video-call camera
- Display: 2.2 inches, TFT, 256K colors
- Connectivity: GPRS: 32–48 kbit/s, EDGE: 236.8 kbit/s, 3G–HSDPA (3.6 Mbit/s); Bluetooth v2.0 with A2DP
- Data inputs: Keypad
- Development status: Available
- Other: Eco friendly handset

The J105 (Naite) is a Sony Ericsson mobile phone from its J series of phones, which was released in May 2009. It was a relatively cheap candybar phone that was placed at the bottom of Sony Ericsson's "Greenheart" range. The 2 MP fixed-focus camera is capable of capturing a still picture at a resolution of 1600×1200 pixels, and recording with a 320×240-pixel resolution at a 15 fps frame rate.

== Features ==
The phone was the cheapest handset with 3G capabilities and secondary video-calling camera at the time of its launch.

== Java Platform 8 ==
It has Sony Ericsson Java Platform 8 profile and so allows Flash Lite to run as a front-end to Java ME.
