= Sony Ericsson Cedar =

Mobile phone produced by Sony Ericsson

Sony Ericsson J108i (Cedar)
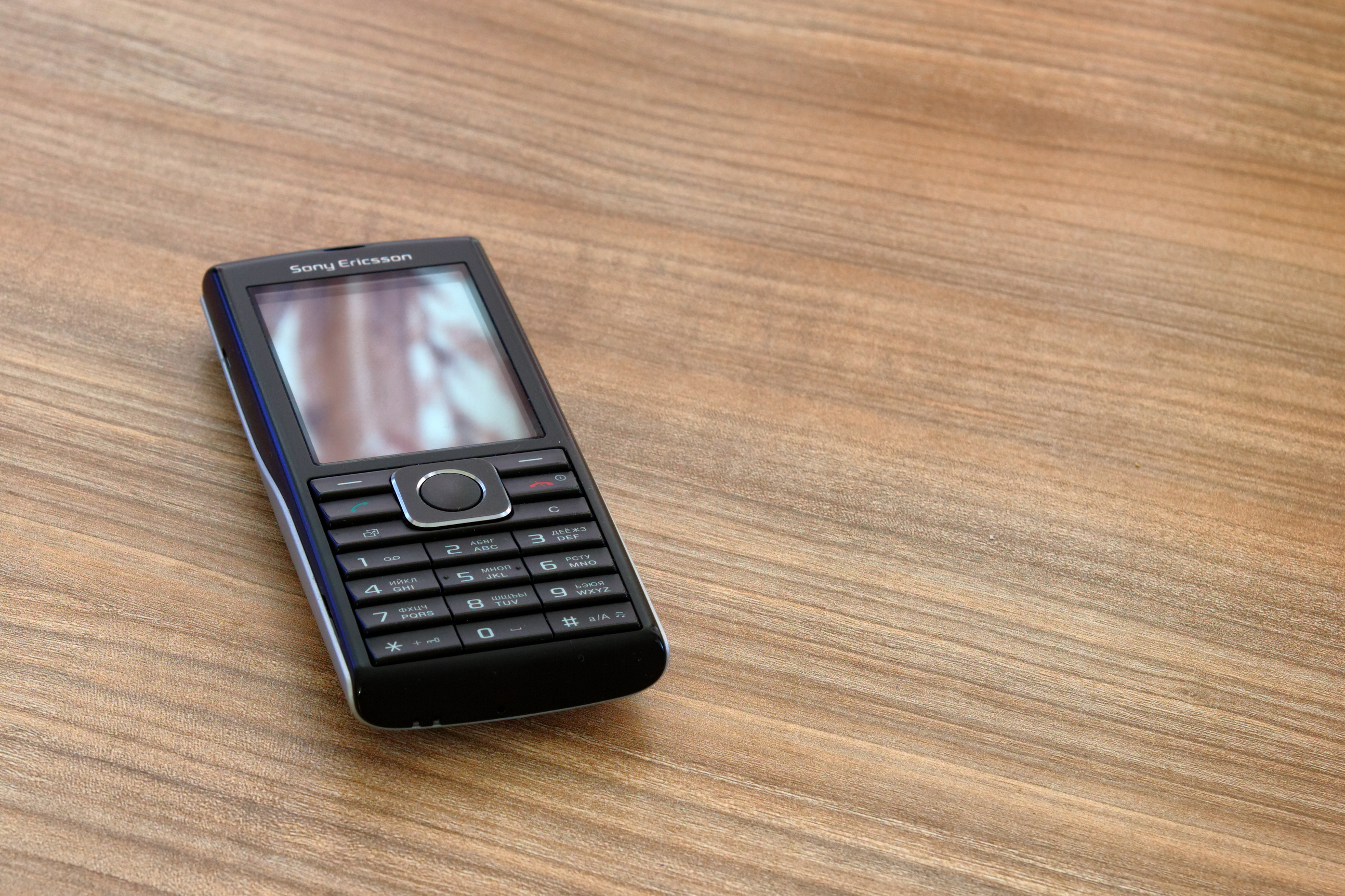
- Sony Ericsson Cedar
- Also known as: Sony Ericsson J108i, Sony Ericsson J108a, Sony Ericsson Cedar GreenHeart
- Manufacturer: Sony Ericsson Mobile Communications
- Type: Feature phone
- Series: J Series
- First released: September 2010; 15 years ago
- Predecessor: Sony Ericsson Naite J105i
- Related: Sony Ericsson Hazel J20i Sony Ericsson Elm J10i2 Sony Ericsson Aino U10i Sony Ericsson Zylo W20i Sony Ericsson Spiro W100i
- Compatible networks: UMTS 850, UMTS 1900, UMTS 2100 (850 only supported by J108a), GSM 850, GSM 900, GSM 1800, GSM 1900
- Form factor: Candybar
- Dimensions: 111×49×15.5 mm (4.37×1.93×0.61 in)
- Weight: 85 g (3 oz) (0.187 lb)
- Operating system: Sony Ericsson Proprietary (A200)
- Memory: 280 MB integrated, MicroSD 512 MB in box, SanDisk microSD transflash supported
- Storage: 280 MB
- Removable storage: up to 16 GB
- SIM: Standard SIM, 1 Slot
- Battery: 1000 mAh BST-43 Battery (Li-Polymer)
- Rear camera: 2.0MP
- Display: 2.2” QVGA (240×320 pixels; ~182 ppi pixel density), 262,144 (18-bit) colour TFT LCD
- Connectivity: 3.5 Mbit/s HSDPA, W-CDMA, EDGE, GPRS, HSCSD, CSD, Bluetooth 2.1, USB (with Mass Storage Mode, PictBridge Mode support)
- Model: J108i, J108a

The Sony Ericsson Cedar (J108i), also known as Sony Ericsson Cedar GreenHeart, is a mobile phone from SE's J series of phones produced by Sony Ericsson released in September 2010. It is the last Sony Ericsson phone that run on proprietary Sony Ericsson A2 Operating System as Greenheart switched to the Sony Xperia line of Android Smartphones. The phone is one of Sony Ericsson's environmentally friendly "Greenheart" range, featuring devices made of recycled materials, longer battery life and low-energy chargers, as well as minimal use of paper through reduced packaging and the replacement of the traditional printed user manual with one stored on the phone. This device also the first cell phone from Sony Ericsson to fully abandon Sony's Proprietary Charger and Memory Card Format, The Memory Stick Pro Duo used in older models and Memory Stick Micro (M2) used in more newer feature models by using standard Micro USB for Charging and Data Transfer and Micro SD Format for expandability, adding the standard 3.5mm headphone jack on the top.

J108i and J108a is a successor to Sony Ericsson J105i Naite, released last year in May 2009. This phone design is very similar to Sony Ericsson Elm J10i2 released few months earlier in March 2010. With 'Human Curvature' Sony Ericsson design philosophy for comfort while holding the phone and ladder design keyboard for ease of texting.

This model is available in Grey and Black and Red and Black colors. Although variations such as fully black and fully white might exist.

Being a last Sony Ericsson phone to run on the A200 Operating System, it had a Java Platform 8.5 and Flash Lite 3.1.

== Design and features ==
Key features include:

- Sony 2-megapixel camera
- Bluetooth 2.1 (10 m)
- Web Access (NetFront browser included)
- Exchange ActiveSync
- 3.5G high speed internet (Support up to 3.6 Mbit/s (download speed), 384 kbit/s (upload speed))
- Multiple audio playback (AAC, WAV, MP3, WMA)
- Built in Media Center (Sony PSP/PS3 XrossMediaBar menu)
- microSD memory card slot to expand the memory to up to 16 GB.
- Messaging SMS (threaded view), MMS, Email, Push Email, IM
