= Bsharri =

Town in Lebanon

Bsharri بشرّي
- City
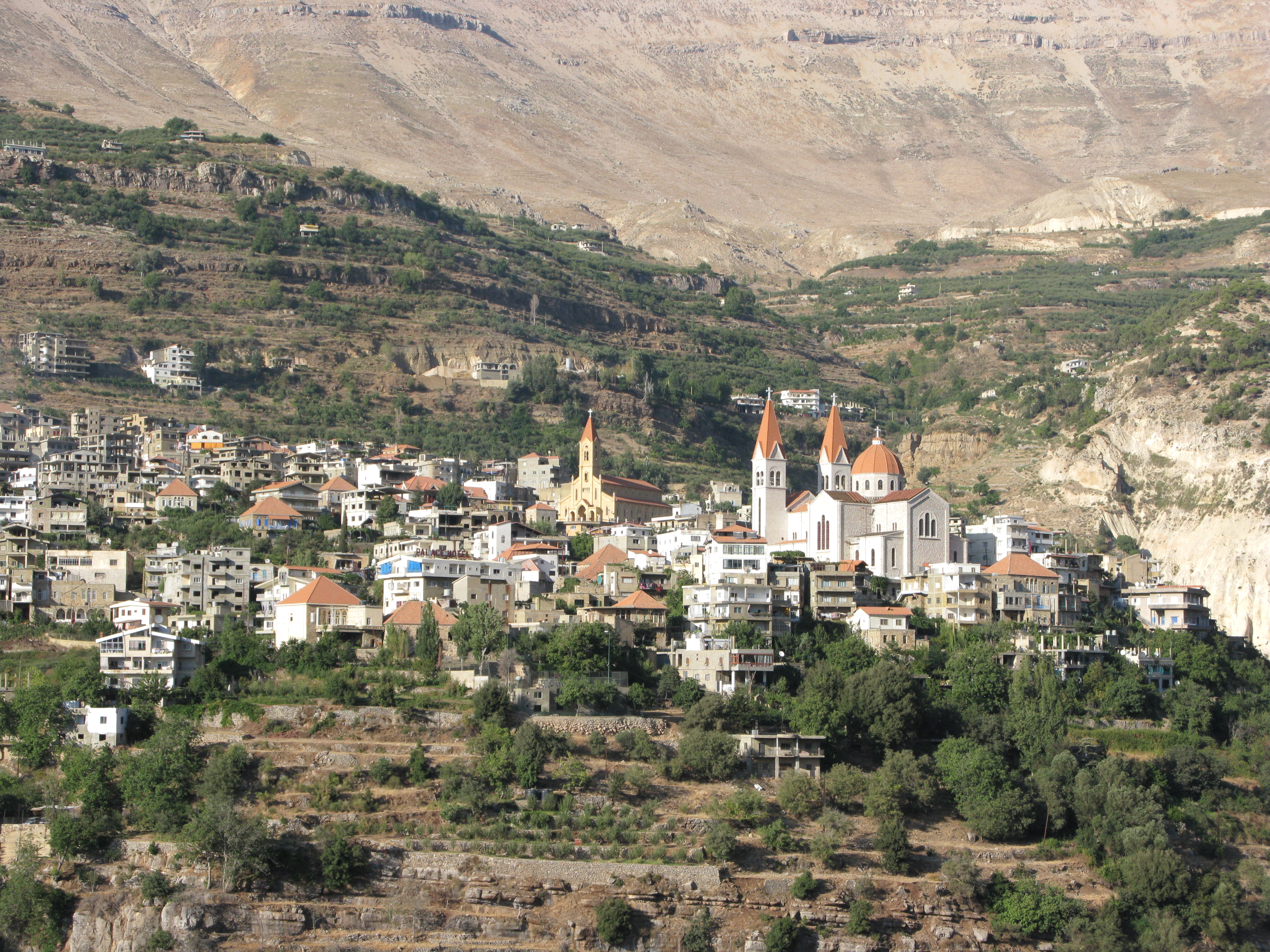
- Urban landscape with Saint Sava Cathedral

- Location within Lebanon
- Coordinates: 34°15′4″N 36°0′40″E
- Country: Lebanon
- Governorate: North Governorate
- District: Bsharri District

Area
  - Total: 62.07 km^{2} (23.97 sq mi)
- Elevation: 1,500 m (4,900 ft)

Population
  - Total: 24,000
  - Density: 390/km^{2} (1,000/sq mi)
- Demonym: Bsherroniye
- Time zone: UTC+2 (EET)
  - Summer (DST): UTC+3 (EEST)
- Dialing code: +961
- Website: www.bcharri.gov.lb

Bsharri (Arabic: بشرّي Bšarrī; also romanized Becharre, Bcharre, Bsharre, Bcharre Al Arz) is a Lebanese town located in the district of the same name, North Governorate, situated at altitudes between 1,100 m (3,600 ft) and 3,088 m (10,131 ft). Bsharri is the location of the Cedars of God, a UNESCO World Heritage Site and the only remaining place where the Cedrus libani (Lebanese cedar) tree grows natively. The region is the birthplace of famed poet, painter and sculptor Khalil Gibran; a museum in town honours his life and work.

As Bsharri is mountainous and experiences freezing winters, it is home to Lebanon's oldest ski resort, the Cedars Ski Resort, as well as the country's original ski lift, which was built in 1953. The resort is about 130 km (81 mi) from Beirut, approximately two hours' driving time. Qurnat as Sawdā Mountain is the highest peak in the Levant, at 3,088 meters above sea level.

Bsharri is at the head of the Holy Kadisha Valley, a natural area which contains some of the oldest Christian monastic communities in the Middle East. A center of Maronite Christianity, the area also features the largest cathedral in the Levant region, the Saint Saba Cathedral, constructed by Anthony II Peter Arida. As the city is home to nearly 40 churches and houses-of-worship, it is sometimes referred to as "the city of churches".

== History ==
The name Bsharri (بشرّي), Beth Shareer, can be found in the Aramaic language. Bsharri means House of Truth in Aramaic. Maronite Christians fleeing persecution sought refuge in its mountainous terrain in the 7th Century AD. The Kadisha Valley, below the town, became the spiritual center of the Maronite Church. The town was known as Buissera by the Crusades.

Residents of Bsharri are known for their distinct accent when they speak Lebanese Arabic. Unlike other parts of Lebanon, Aramaic was spoken in Bsharri as a liturgical language well into the 19th century. As a result, Bsharri natives developed an unmistakably strong accent that lasts to this day.

During the Lebanese civil war, many young men joined the Lebanese Phalanges. In 1986 Samir Geagea, a Bsharri native, became head of the Lebanese Forces (LF) militia (now a political party). Many LF militants were drawn from the town during the civil war.

== Culture ==
Today, the town is located in a highly touristic zone including many attractions such as the Khalil Gibran Museum, the Kadisha Valley, the Kadisha Grotto, the Cedars of God forest and several ski resorts. Bsharri is home to a Lebanese Red Cross First Aid Center, also to “The Maronite Scouts” that started their activities in early 2000. On July 13, 2018, International Colombian singer of Lebanese heritage, Shakira, performed in Bsharri during the Cedars International Festival in the presence of 13,000 people. The visit was a part of her 2018 world tour, the El Dorado World Tour.

On March 22, 2019, The municipalities of Bsharri, Lebanon, and Val d’Isère, France inked an agreement to promote cultural exchange between the two towns. The cultural exchange program aims to build bridges for French and Lebanese youth that want to experience the unique cultural relationship and similarities the two countries possess. The mayor of Val d’Isère, Marc Bauer, led a French delegation to Lebanon to inaugurate a program aimed at promoting cultural and athletic exchange between the two famous ski locations.

Andrea Bocelli performed at the opening ceremony of The Cedars International Festival-Bsharri (CIF) before an audience of 8,000 people. Before the festival, Bocelli visited the Cedars of God, where he was received by the head of the Lebanese Forces Party, Samir Geagea.

Bsharri natives are also known for their strong Christian faith. Throughout the year, many religious festivities and commemorations take place in the town, attracting thousands from neighbouring villages.

== Cedars ski resort ==
The Cedars resort is located in the North of Lebanon. Skiers came to the resort as early as 1920, and have been returning there ever since. The first lift was installed by the government in 1953.

The Cedars resort has a slightly longer season than the others, sometimes beginning early November and often lasting until late April. Pisted and off-piste skiing is possible, as well as Nordic skiing and skidoo rides. In summer 2005, The Cedars resort installed three new chairlifts to replace the old T-bars and extend the ski runs. Fifteen million US Dollars have lately been invested to upgrade the facilities and raise the standard of the resort's accommodation, equipment, safety and services.

An ongoing project envisages a gondola that would carry skiers and visitors from the parking level at 2,095 metres (6,873 ft) to the highest accessible summit of 2,870 metres (9,420 ft). There is no indication yet of when and whether this will be finalized. To comply with international regulations, a refuge with a capacity of 400 persons also needs be built at the top of the gondola, and equipped with telescopes allowing vistas as far away as the island of Cyprus.

== Geography ==
=== Climate ===
Bsharri has a continental Mediterranean climate (Csb/Dsb, according to the Köppen climate classification), with dry and mild summers and cold, snowy winters. Temperatures in the summer can go above 30 °C (86 °F) a few times per year. On the other hand, temperatures can fall occasionally to −15 °C (5 °F) and on Bsharri mountain to −30 °C (−22 °F) during the winter. Heavy snowfall is observed every year and accumulations of over 2 m (80 in) and on Bsharri mountain of 7 m (280 in) are not unheard of.

Climate data for Bsharri
Month	Jan	Feb	Mar	Apr	May	Jun	Jul	Aug	Sep	Oct	Nov	Dec	Year
Mean daily maximum °C (°F)	4 (39)	4 (39)	6 (43)	11 (52)	16 (61)	20 (68)	22 (72)	23 (73)	20 (68)	16 (61)	11 (52)	7 (45)	13 (56)
Daily mean °C (°F)	0 (32)	0 (32)	2 (36)	7 (45)	11.5 (52.7)	15 (59)	17 (63)	17.5 (63.5)	15 (59)	11.5 (52.7)	7 (45)	3.5 (38.3)	8.9 (48.2)
Mean daily minimum °C (°F)	−4 (25)	−4 (25)	−2 (28)	3 (37)	7 (45)	10 (50)	12 (54)	12 (54)	10 (50)	7 (45)	3 (37)	0 (32)	5 (40)
Average precipitation mm (inches)	221 (8.7)	166 (6.5)	127 (5.0)	61 (2.4)	31 (1.2)	4 (0.2)	0 (0)	0 (0)	6 (0.2)	39 (1.5)	97 (3.8)	172 (6.8)	924 (36.3)
Source: climatetemp.info

== Demographics ==
In 2014, Christians made up 99.41% of registered voters in Bsharri. 94.52% of the voters were Maronite Catholics.

== Gallery ==
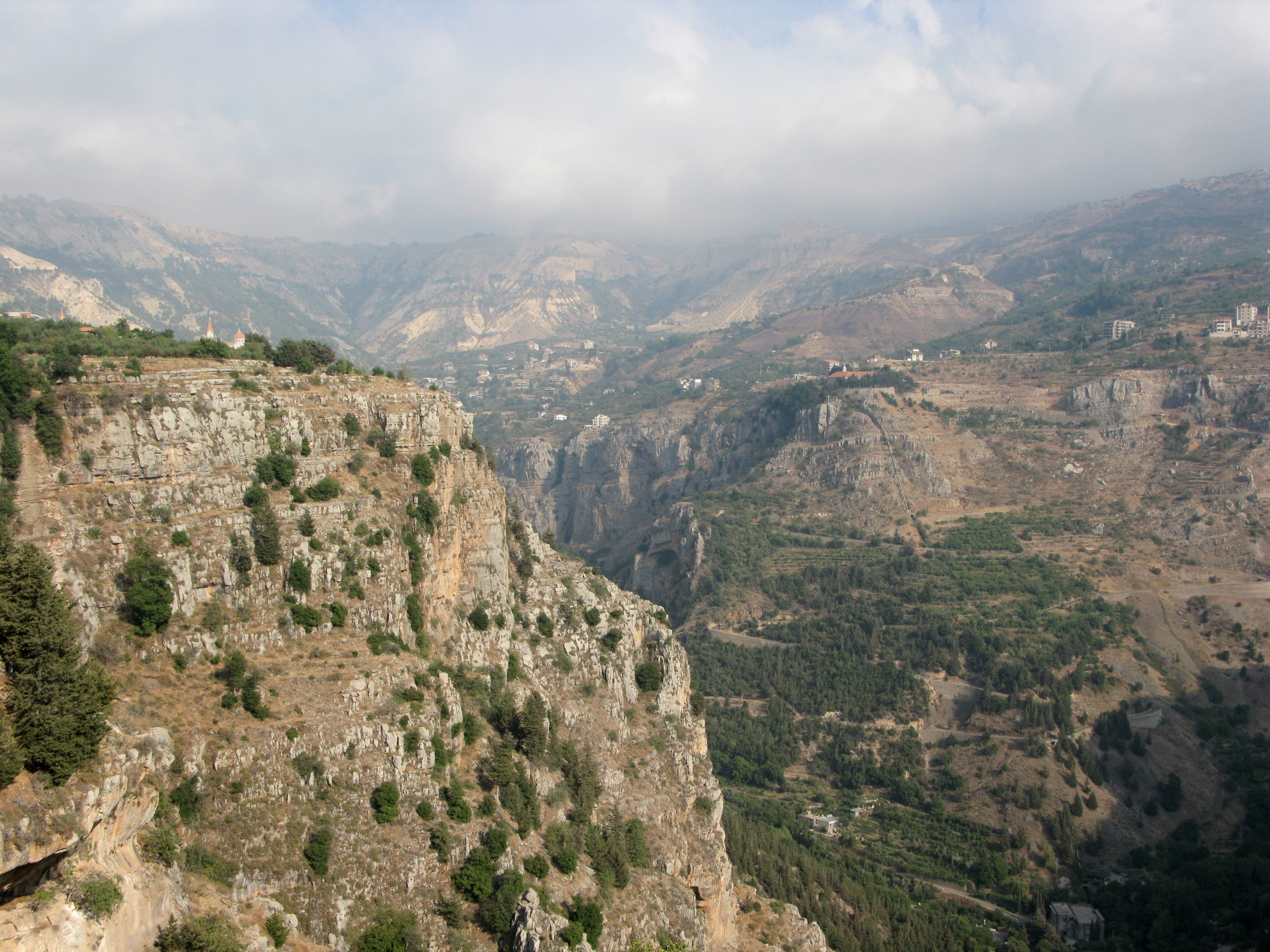
Kadisha Valley

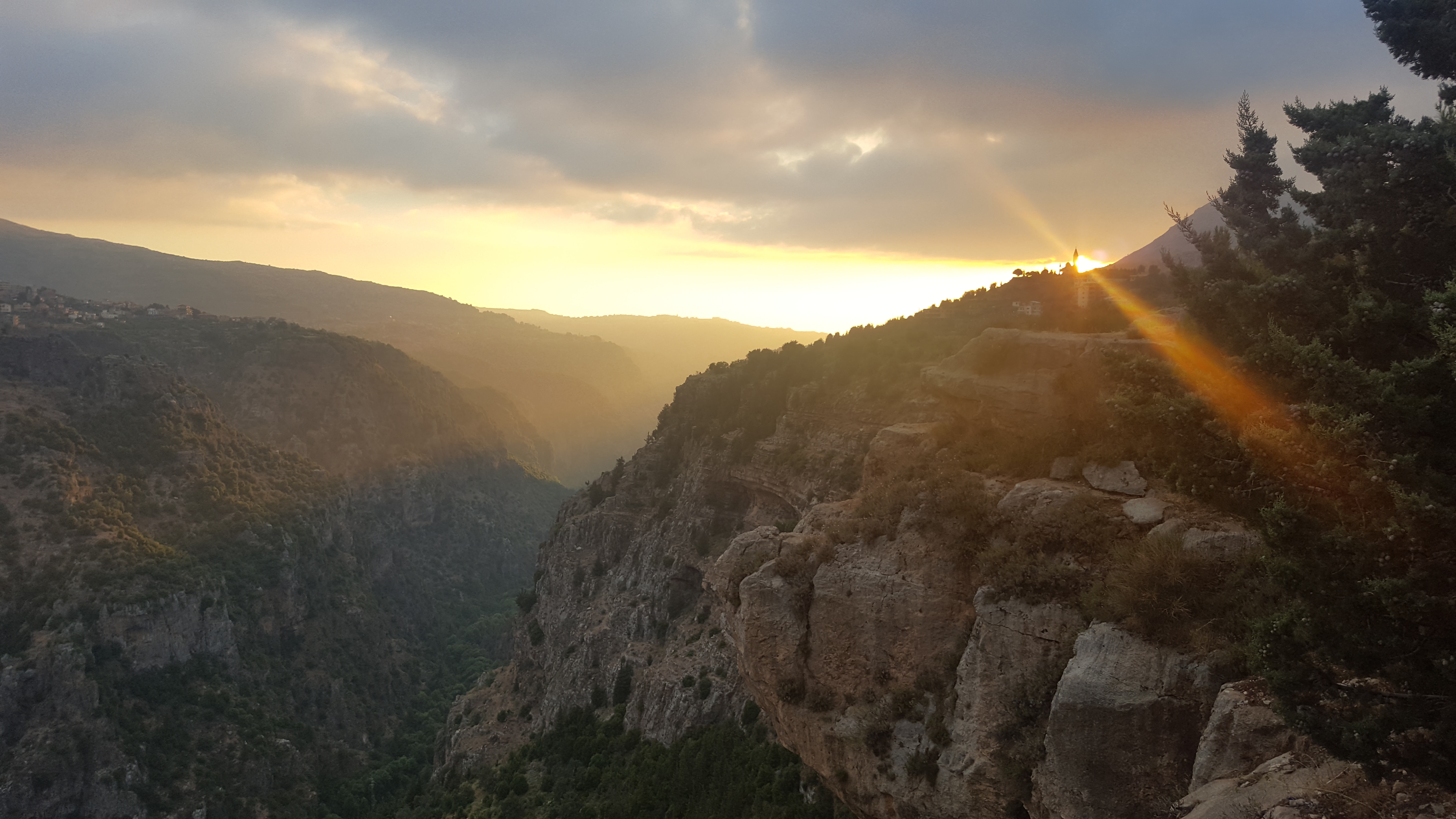
Kadisha valley

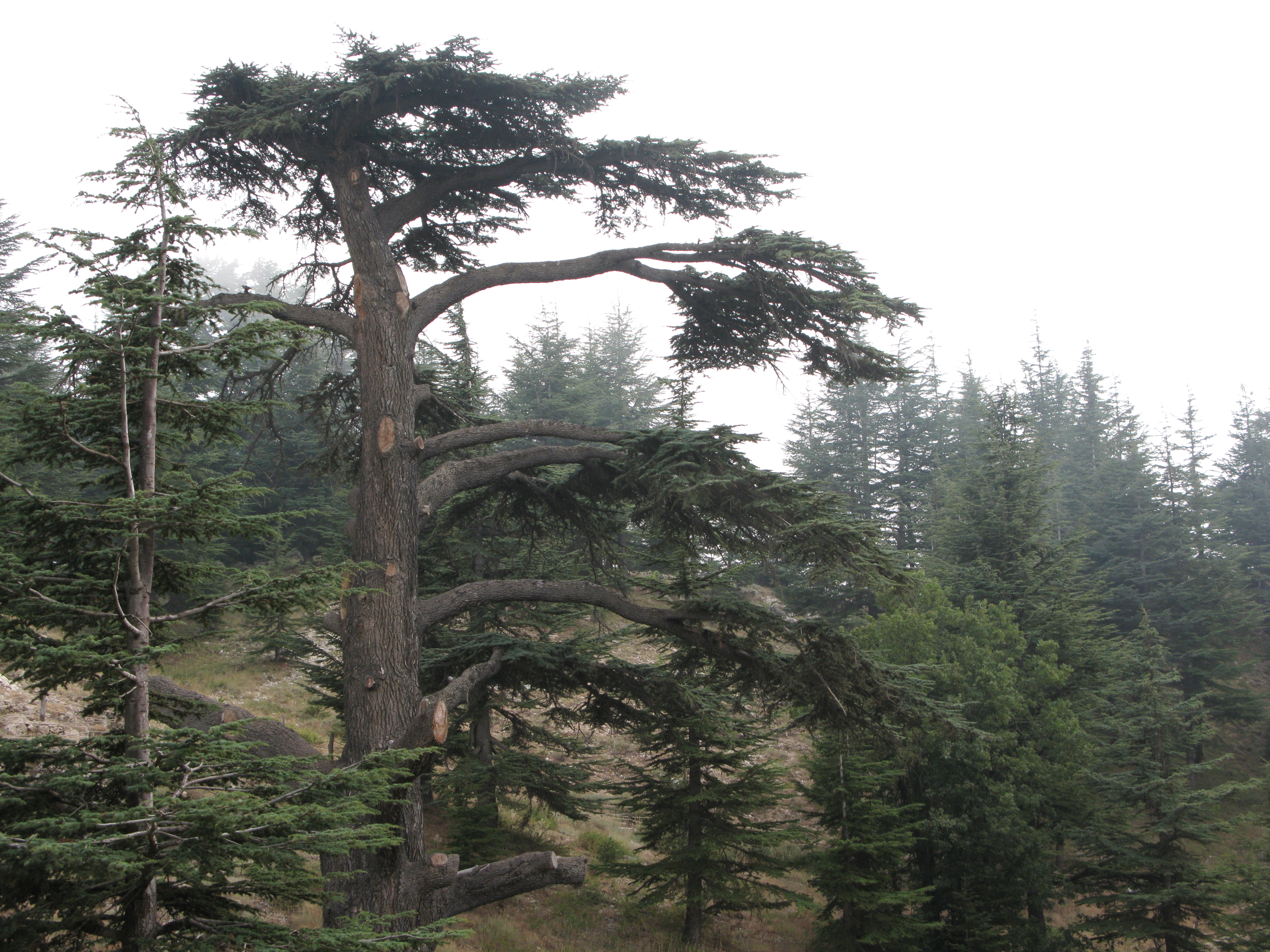
Forest of the Cedars of God

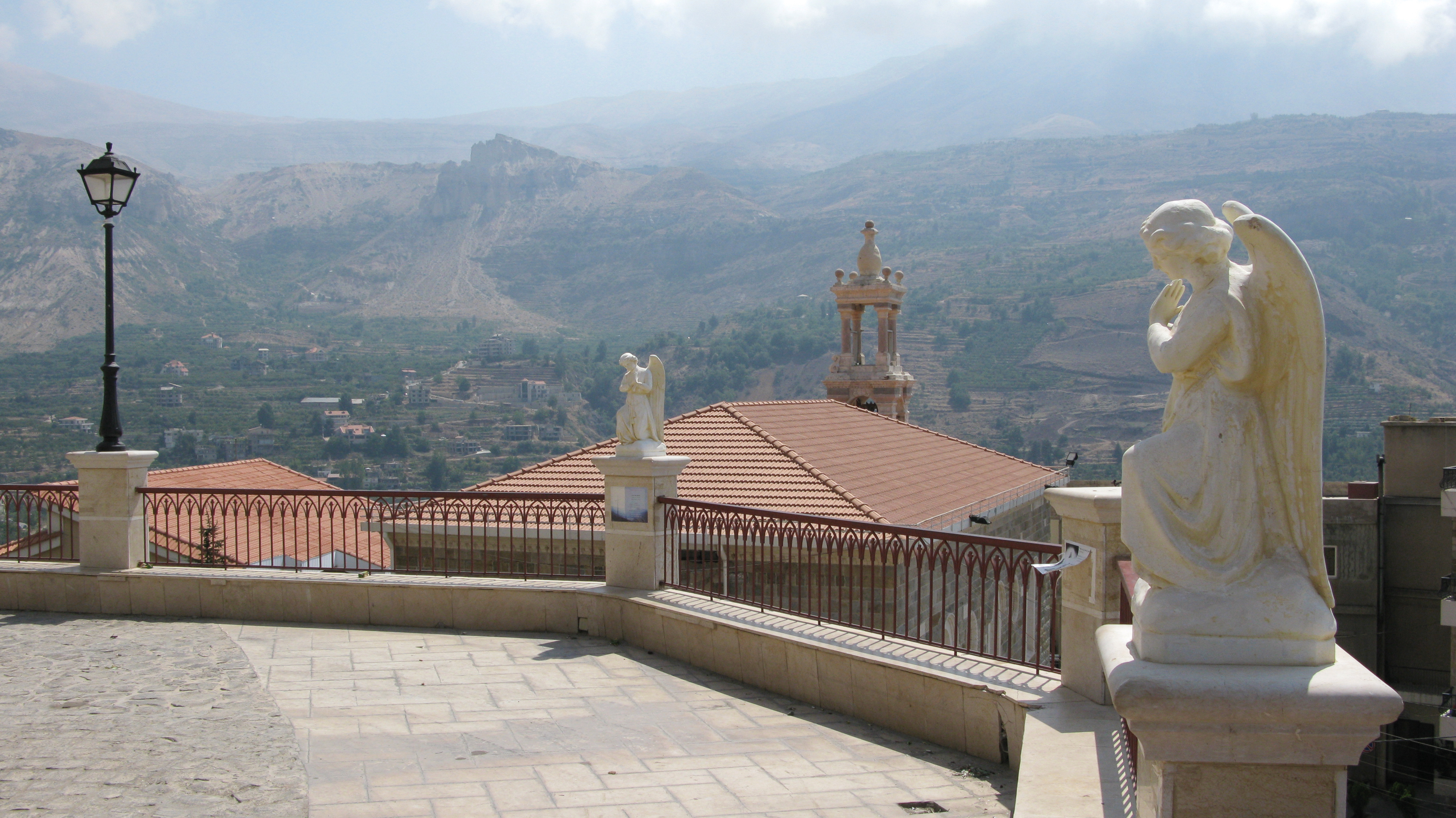
Cathedral square

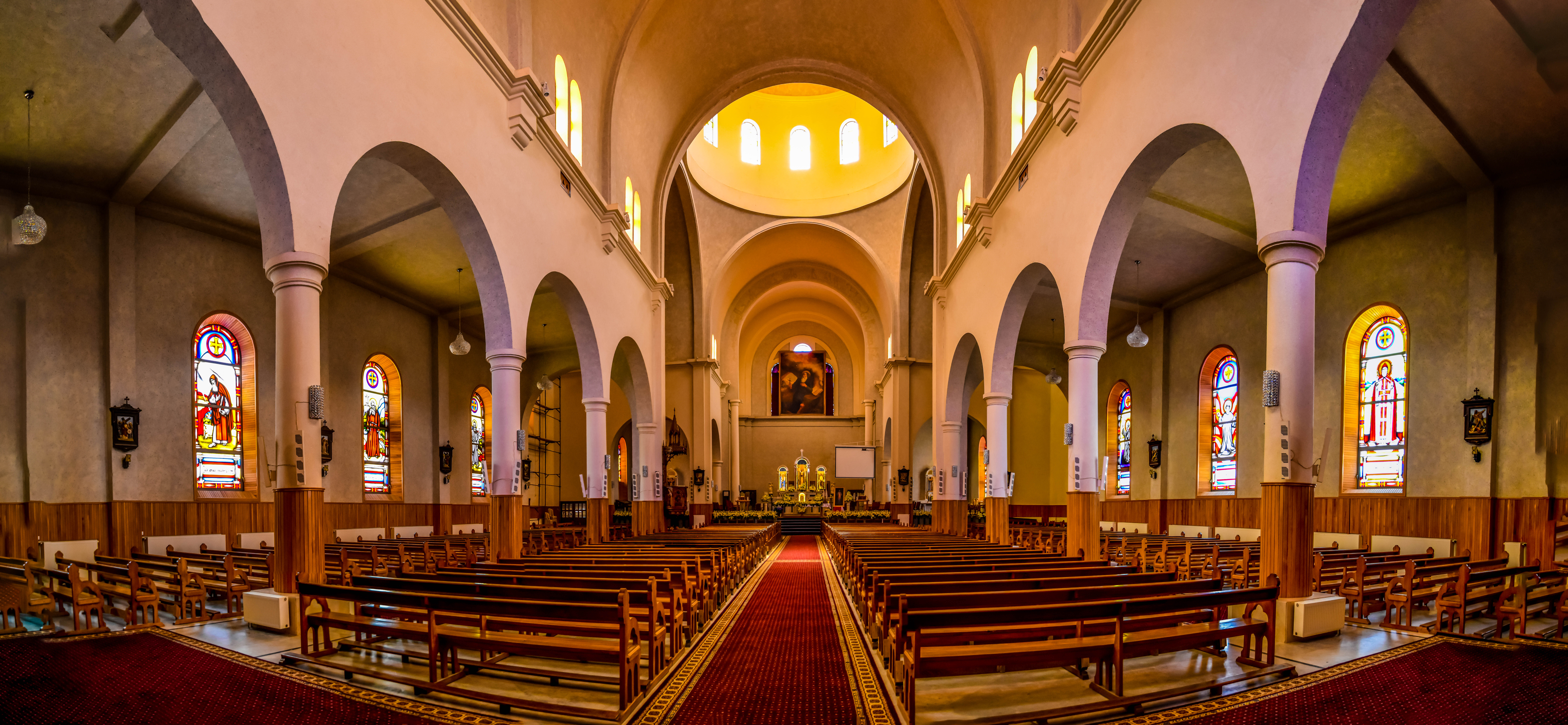

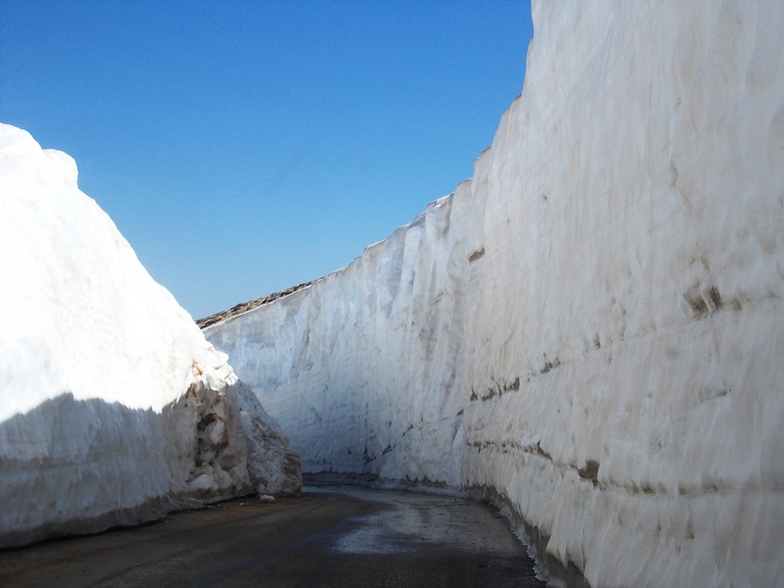
Dahr al-Kadib during spring time

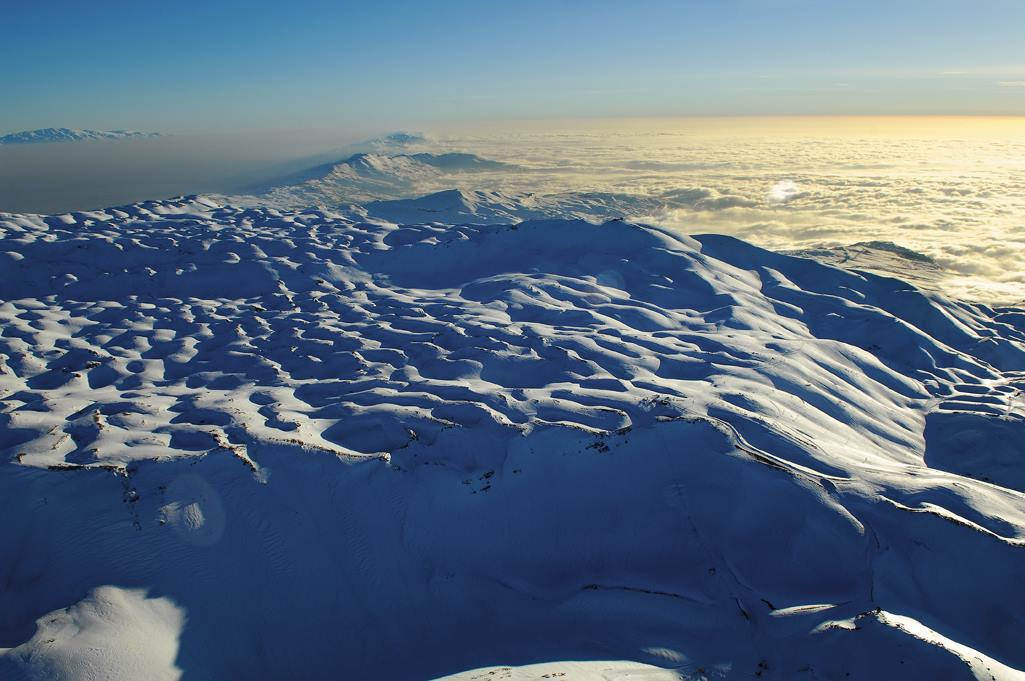
The top of Qornet al-Sawda

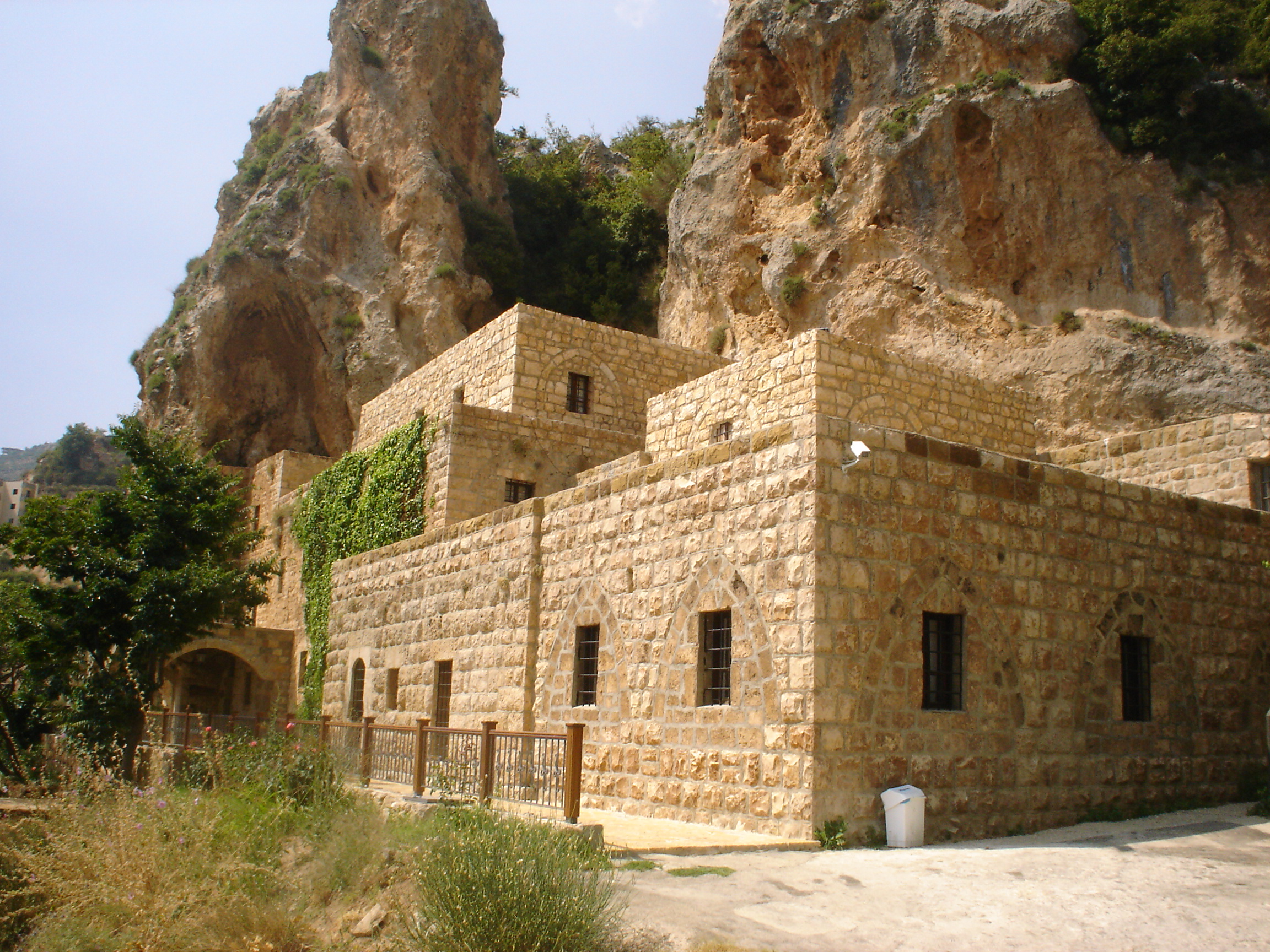
Gibran Museum

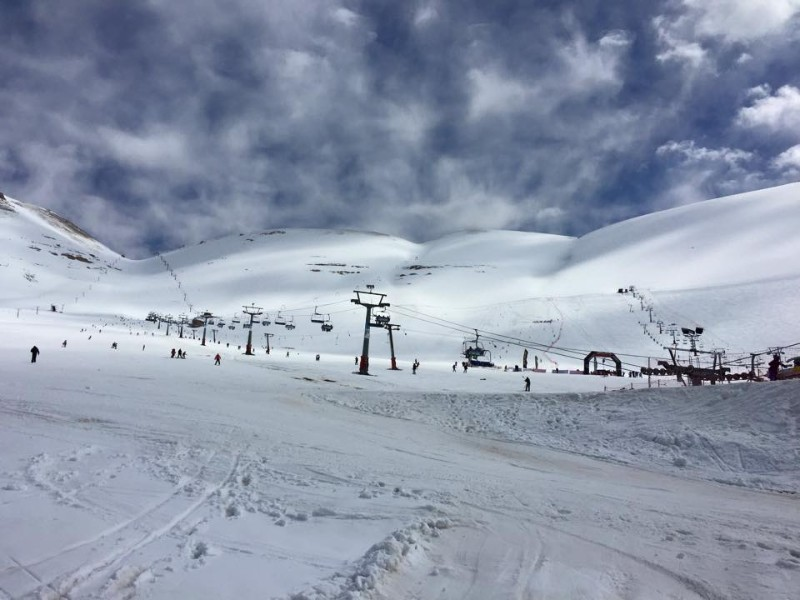
Cedars Ski Resort

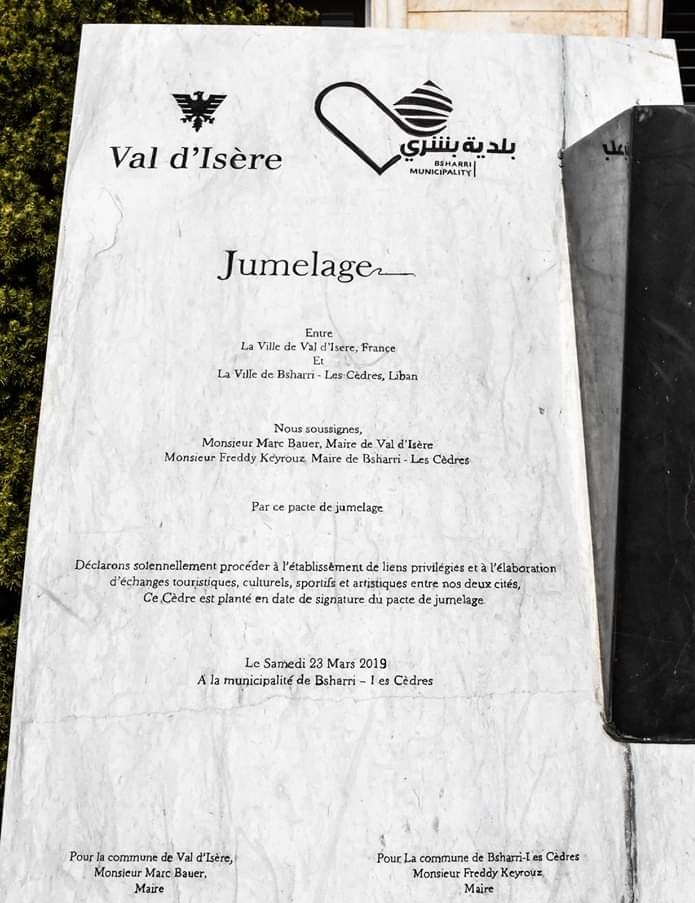
Bsharri, Lebanon, and Val d’Isère, France inked an agreement

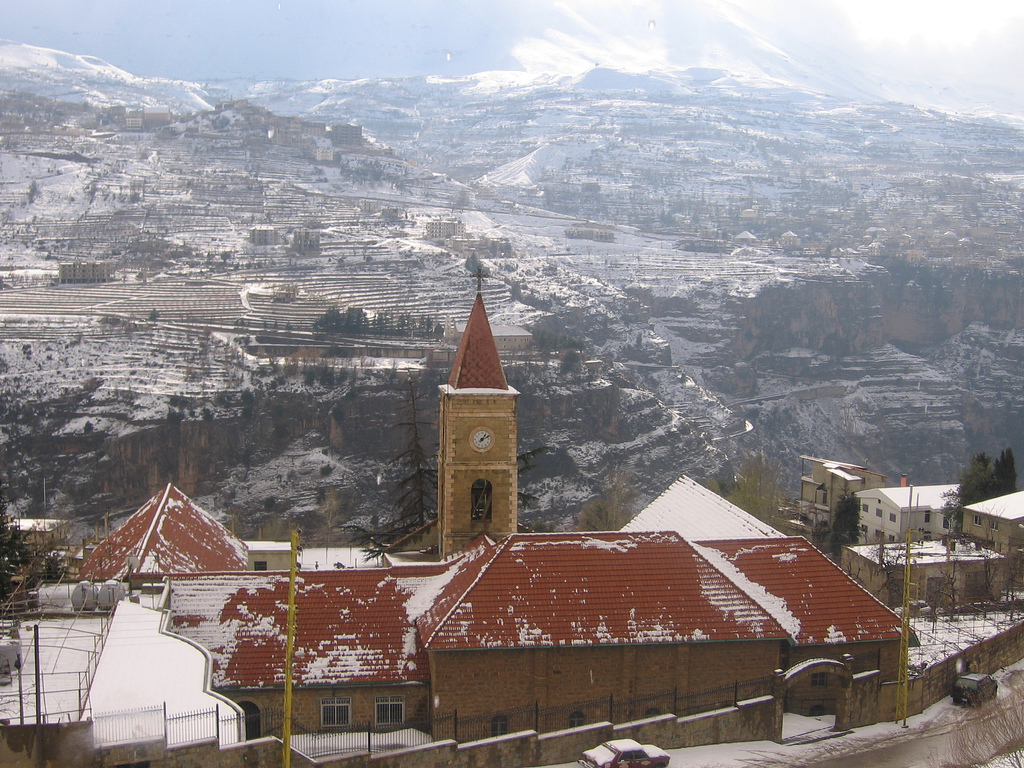
Snow in Bsharri

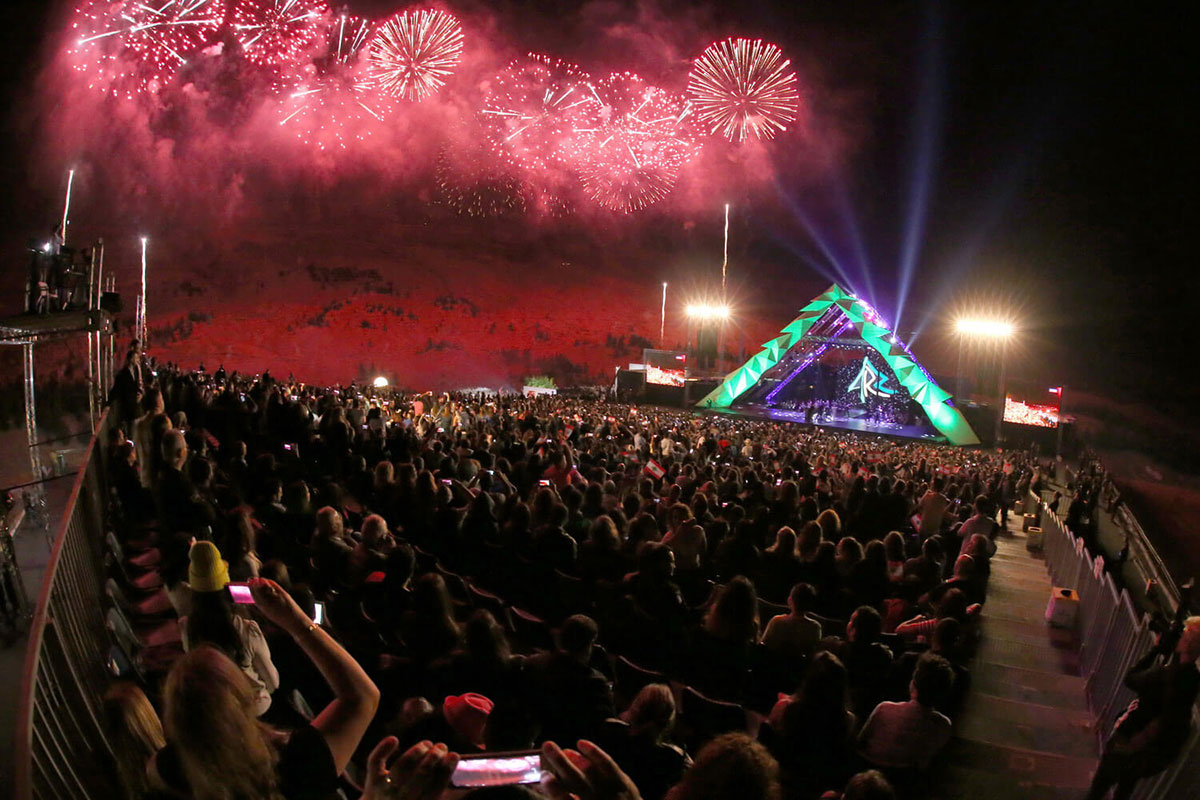
Cedars International festival, 2017

== Notable residents ==
- Khalil Gibran (1883–1931), writer, poet and visual artist
- Vénus Khoury-Ghata (1937–2026), poet and writer
- Antoine Choueiri (1939–2010), media executive
- Samir Geagea (born 1952), head of the Lebanese Forces party

== See also ==
- Dimane
