= Cedar (name) =

Cedar is a name.

Notable people and fictional characters with the name include:

== Given name ==
- Cedar Bowers, Canadian writer
- Cedar Paul (1880–1972), née Gertrude Mary Davenport, British singer, author, translator and journalist
- Cedar Prest (born 1940), Australian stained glass artist
- Cedar Sigo (born 1978), American author
- Cedar Walton (1934–2013), American jazz pianist

== Surname ==
- Howard Cedar (born 1943), Israeli American biochemist
- Jon Cedar (1931–2011), American character actor, screenwriter and producer
- Joseph Cedar (born 1968), Israeli film director and screenwriter
- Larry Cedar (born 1955), American actor and a voice actor

== Fictional characters ==
- Cedar Wood, a character from Ever After High
