= Cedars of God =

UNESCO World Heritage Site in Lebanon

Forest of the Cedars of God
UNESCO World Heritage Site
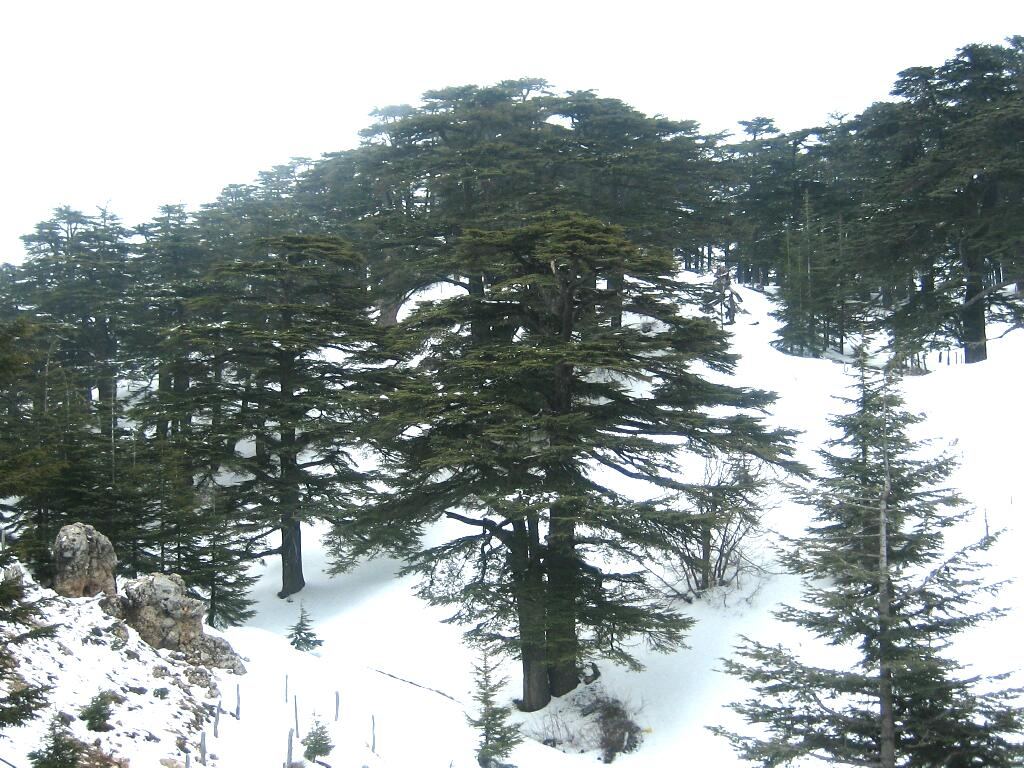

- Location within Lebanon Location within West and Central Asia
- Location: Bsharri, North Governorate, Lebanon
- Part of: Wadi Qadisha (the Holy Valley) and the Forest of the Cedars of God (Horsh Arz el-Rab) Bsharri
- Criteria: Cultural: (iii)(iv)
- Reference: 850-002
- Inscription: 1998 (22nd Session)
- Area: 10.2 ha (25 acres)
- Buffer zone: 646 ha (1,600 acres)
- Coordinates: 34°14′42″N 36°02′53″E

The Cedars of God (Arabic: أرز الربّ, romanized: Arz el-Rab, lit. 'Cedars of the Lord') is a forest in the Kadisha Valley of Bsharre, Lebanon. It is a vestige of the extensive forests of the Lebanon cedar that thrived across Mount Lebanon in antiquity. Early modern travelers' accounts of the wild cedars appear to refer to the ones in Bsharri; the Christian monks of the monasteries in the Kadisha Valley venerated the trees for centuries. The earliest documented references of the Cedars of God are found in Tablets 4–6 of the Epic of Gilgamesh.

The Phoenicians, Israelites, Egyptians, Assyrians, Babylonians, Persians, Romans, Arabs, and Turks used Lebanese timber. The Egyptians valued it for shipbuilding, and in the Ottoman Empire the timber was used to construct railways.

== History ==
=== Ancient history ===
The mountains of Lebanon were once shaded by thick cedar forests. After centuries of persistent deforestation, the forested area has been markedly reduced.

It was once said that a battle occurred between the demigods and humans over the beautiful and divine forest of cedar trees near southern Mesopotamia. This forest, once protected by the Sumerian god Enlil, was completely bared of its trees when humans entered 4700 years ago, after winning the battle against the guardians of the forest, the demigods. The story also tells that Gilgamesh used cedar wood to build his city.

Over the centuries, cedar wood was exploited by the Phoenicians, Egyptians, Israelites, Assyrians, Babylonians, Persians, Romans, Arabs, and Turks. The Phoenicians used the cedars for their merchant fleets. They needed timber for their ships and the cedars made them the "first sea trading nation in the world". The Egyptians used cedar resin for the mummification process and the cedar wood for some of "their first hieroglyph bearing rolls of papyrus". In the Bible, Solomon procured cedar timber to build the Temple in Jerusalem. The Cedar Forest of the ancient Mesopotamian religion appears in several sections of the Epic of Gilgamesh. The Lebanon cedar is mentioned 103 times in the Bible. In the Hebrew text it is named ארז and in the Greek text (LXX) it is named κέδρου. For example in Zechariah there is the verse "Open thy doors, O Lebanon, that the fire may devour thy cedars. Howl, fir tree; for the cedar is fallen; because the mighty are spoiled: howl, O ye oaks of Bashan; for the forest of the vintage is come down."

=== Early modern history ===
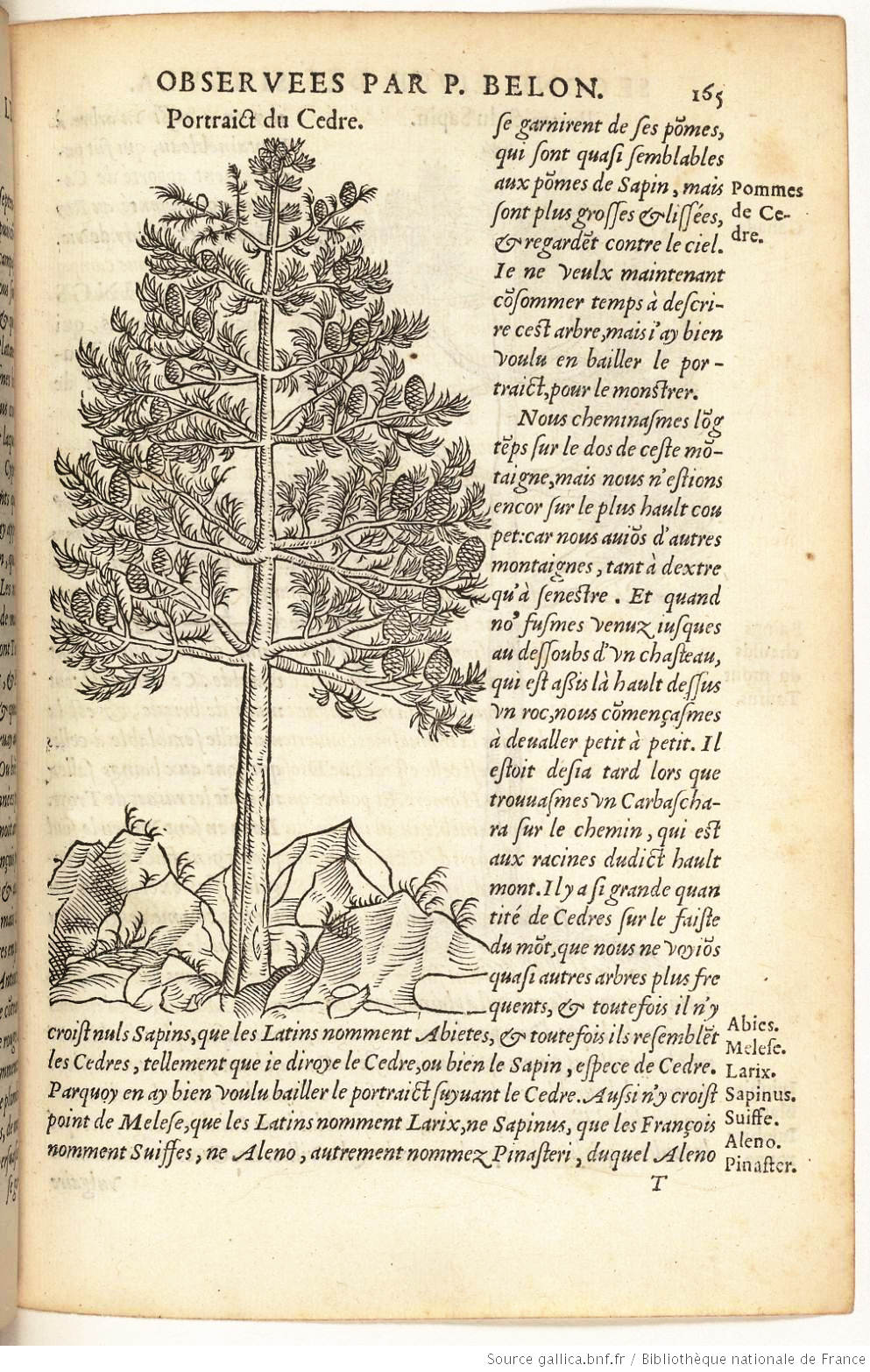
1553 sketch of the Cedars of God, in Pierre Belon's Observations

Early modern travelers' accounts of the wild cedars of Lebanon appear to refer to the Bsharri cedars. Pierre Belon visited the area in 1550, making him the first modern traveler to identify the Cedars of God in his Observations. Belon counted 28 trees:

At a considerable height up the mountains the traveler arrives at the Monastery of the Virgin Mary, which is situated in the valley. Thence proceeding four miles up the mountain, he will arrive at the cedars, the Maronites or the monks acting as guides. The cedars stand in a valley, and not on top of the mountain, and they are supposed to amount to 28 in number, though it is difficult to count them, they being distant from each other a few paces. These the Archbishop of Damascus has endeavored to prove to be the same that Solomon planted with his own hands in the quincunx manner as they now stand. No other tree grows in the valley in which they are situated and it is generally so covered with snow as to be only accessible in summer.

Leonhard Rauwolf followed in 1573–75, counting 24 trees:

... saw nothing higher, but only a small hill before us, all covered with snow, at the bottom whereof the high cedar trees were standing... And, although this hill hath, in former ages, been quite covered with cedars, yet they are since so decreased, that I could tell no more but twenty-four that stood round about in a circle and two others, the branches whereof are quite decayed for age. I also went about this place to look for young ones, but could find none at all.

Jean de Thévenot counted 23 trees in 1655:

It is a Fobbery to say, that if one reckon the Cedars of Mount Lebanon twice, he shall have a different number, for in all, great and small, there is neither more or less than twenty three of them.

Laurent d'Arvieux in 1660 counted 20 trees; and Henry Maundrell in 1697 counted 16 trees of the "very old" type:

Sunday, May 9 The noble (cedar] trees grow amongst the snow near the highest part of Lebanon; and are remarkable as well as for their own age and largeness, as for those frequent allusions made to them in the word of God. Here are some of them very old, and of prodigious bulk; and others younger of a smaller size. Of the former I could reckon up only sixteen, and the latter are very numerous. I measured one of the largest, and found it twelve yards six inches in girt, and yet sound; and thirty seven yards in the spread of its boughs. At about five or six yards from the ground, it was divided into five limbs, each of which was equal to a great tree.

Jean de la Roque in 1722 found 20 trees. In 1738 Richard Pococke provided a detailed description.

... they form a grove about a mile in circumference, which consists of some large cedars that are near to one another, a great number of young cedars, and some pines. The great cedars, at some distance, look like very large spreading oaks; the bodies of the trees are short, dividing at bottom into three or four limbs, some of which growing up together for about ten feet, appear something like those Gothic columns, which seem to be composed of several pillars; higher up they begin to spread horizontally. One that had the roundest body, tho' not the largest, measured twenty four feet in circumference, and another with a sort of triple body, as described above, and of a triangular figure, measured twelve feet on each side. The young cedars are not easily known from pines; I observed they bear a greater quantity of fruit than the large ones. ... there are fifteen large ones standing. The Christians of the several denominations near this place come here to celebrate the festival of the transfiguration, and have built altars against several of the large trees, on which they administer the sacrament. These trees are about half a mile to the north of the road, to which we returned...

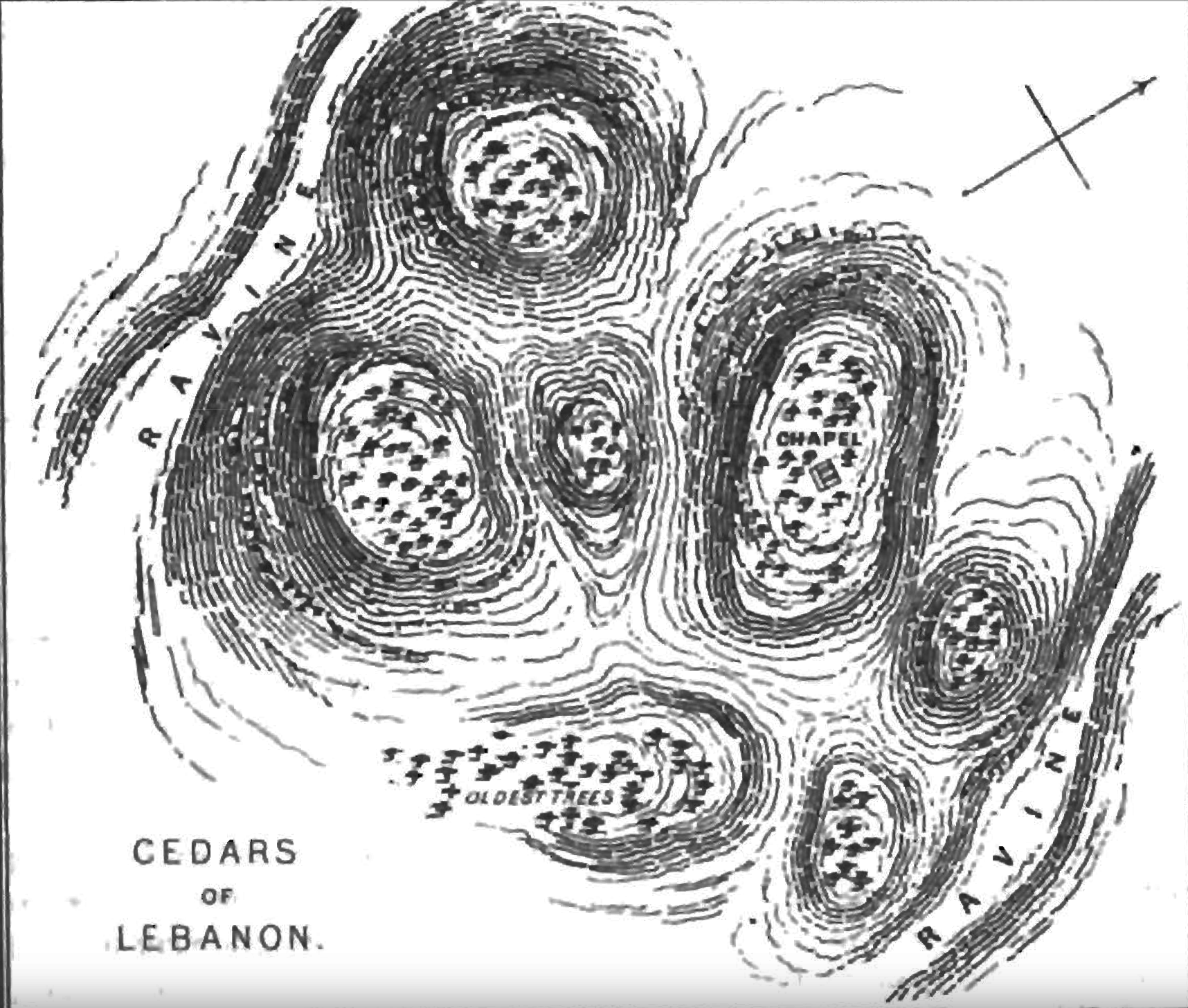
Diagram as drawn in Edward Henry Palmer's 1871 description

From the 19th century onwards, the number of writers recording their visits increased substantially, and the number of cedars counted by the writers was in hundreds. Alphonse de Lamartine visited the place during his travel in Lebanon (1832–33), mentioning the cedars in some texts. In 1871, Edward Henry Palmer of the Palestine Exploration Fund described the cedars as follows:

Descending by a steep zigzag path to the cedars, we pitched our camp and proceeded to examine the sacred and renowned grove, and could not repress a feeling of disappointment at its small extent, and the insignificant appearance of the trees. They consist of a little clump of trees of comparatively modern growth, not more than nine of them showing any indications of a respectable antiquity, and covering only about three acres of ground. They stand on a ridge consisting of five mounds and two spurs running nearly east and west, as in the accompanying plan. The whole number of trees we estimated at about 355; their size has also been grossly exaggerated, none of them being over 80ft. high. The ground is covered with débris of cedar and white limestone ... The trees have been lopped and otherwise maltreated ... They are scrubby scanty specimens, and not half so fine as may be seen in many an English park.

Concern for the protection of the biblical "cedars of God" goes back to 1876, when the 102-hectare (250-acre) grove was surrounded by a high stone wall, paid for by Augusta Victoria of Schleswig-Holstein to protect saplings from browsing by goats. Nevertheless, during World War I, British troops used cedar to build railroads.

=== Modern history ===
Henry Bordeaux visited Lebanon in 1922 and wrote Yamilé sous les cèdres (Yamilé under the cedars), a story about a Christian girl falling in love despite her family's wishes; she is shot dead under a cedar tree. A 1939 film was made by Charles d'Espinay of the story.

Time, along with the exploitation of the wood and the effects of climate change, has led to a decrease in the number of cedar trees in Lebanon. However, Lebanon is still widely known for its cedar tree history, as they are the emblem of the country and the symbol of the Lebanese flag. The remaining trees survive in mountainous areas, where they are the dominant tree species. This is the case on the slopes of Mount Makmel that tower over the Kadisha Valley, where the Cedars of God are found at an altitude of more than 2,000 metres (6,600 ft). Four trees have reached a height of 35 metres (115 ft), with their trunks reaching 12–14 metres (39–46 ft).

In 1998, the Cedars of God were added to the UNESCO list of World Heritage Sites. The forest is rigorously protected. It is possible to tour if escorted by an authorized guide. After a preliminary phase in which the land was cleared of detritus, the sick plants treated, and the ground fertilized, the "Committee of the Friends of the Cedar Forest" initiated a reforestation program in 1985. The Committee planted 200,000 cedars, with 180,000 surviving.

== Gallery ==
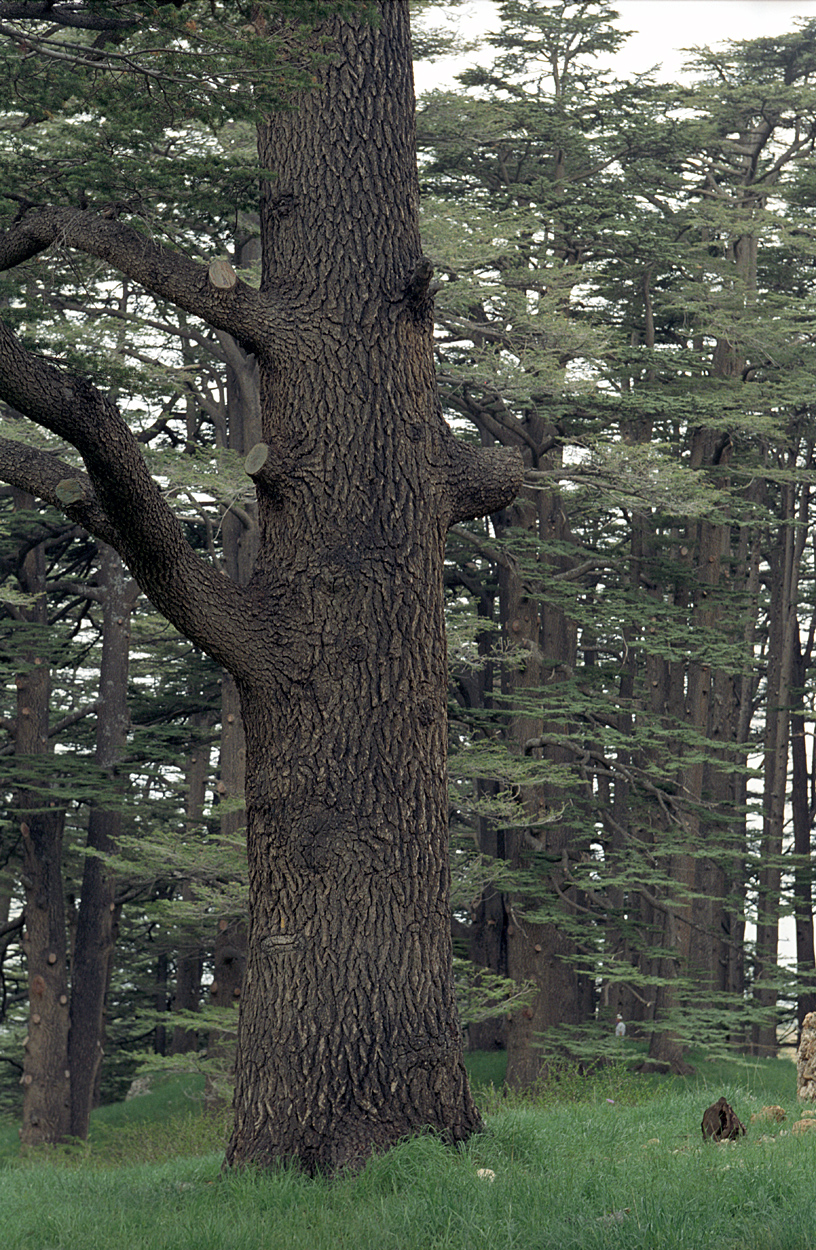

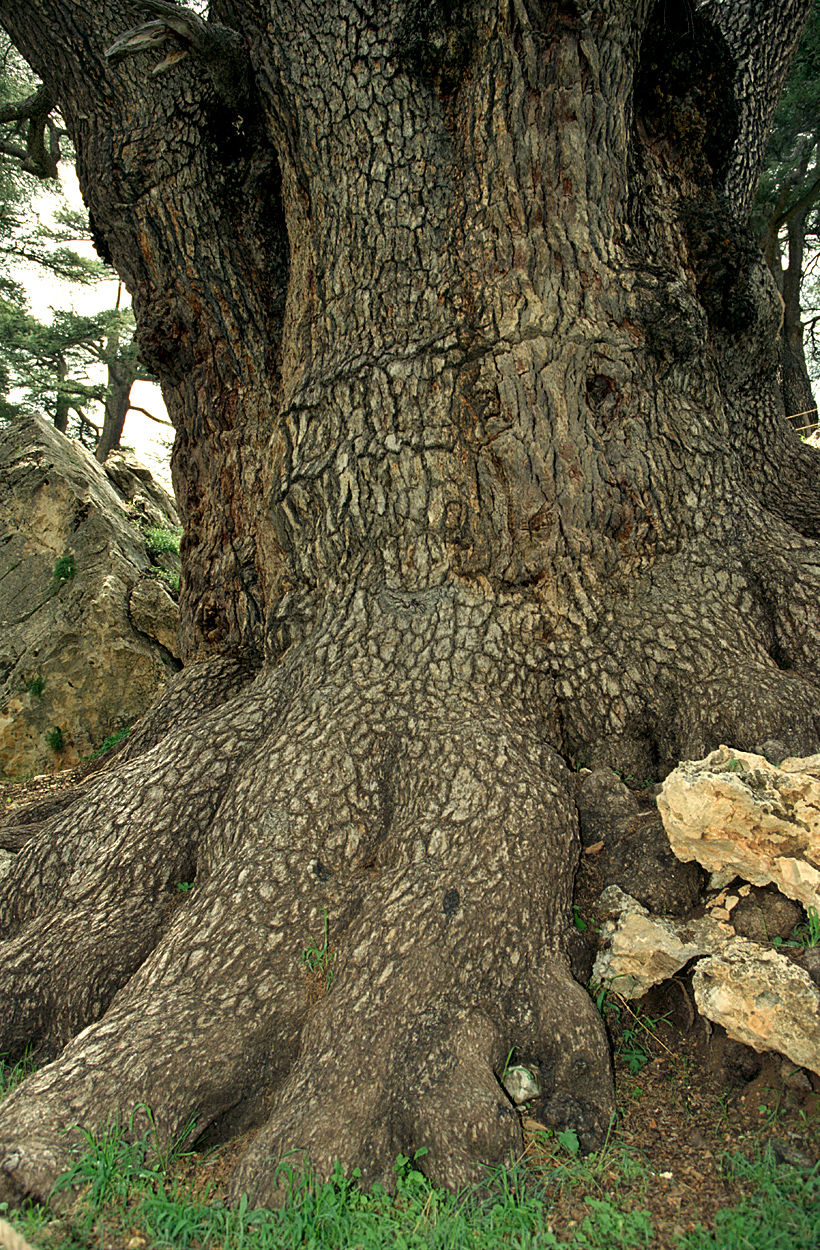

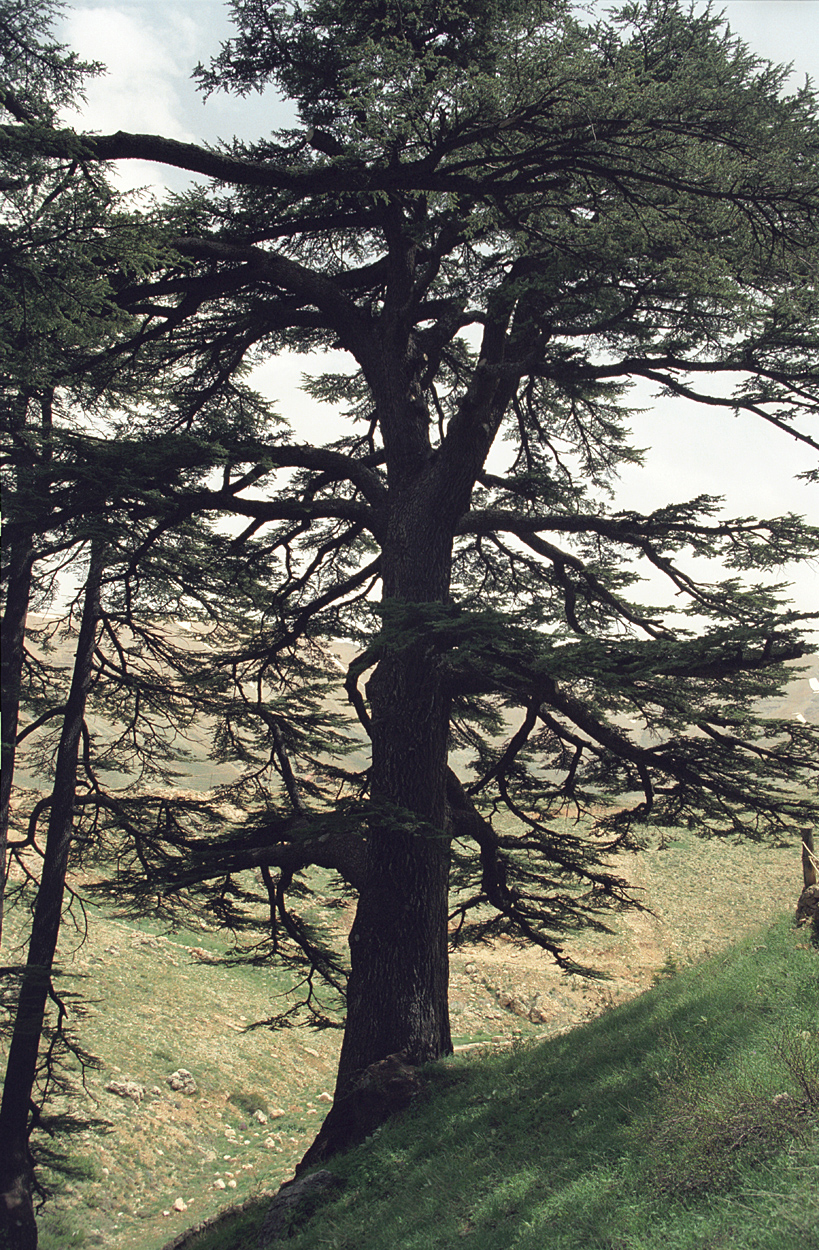
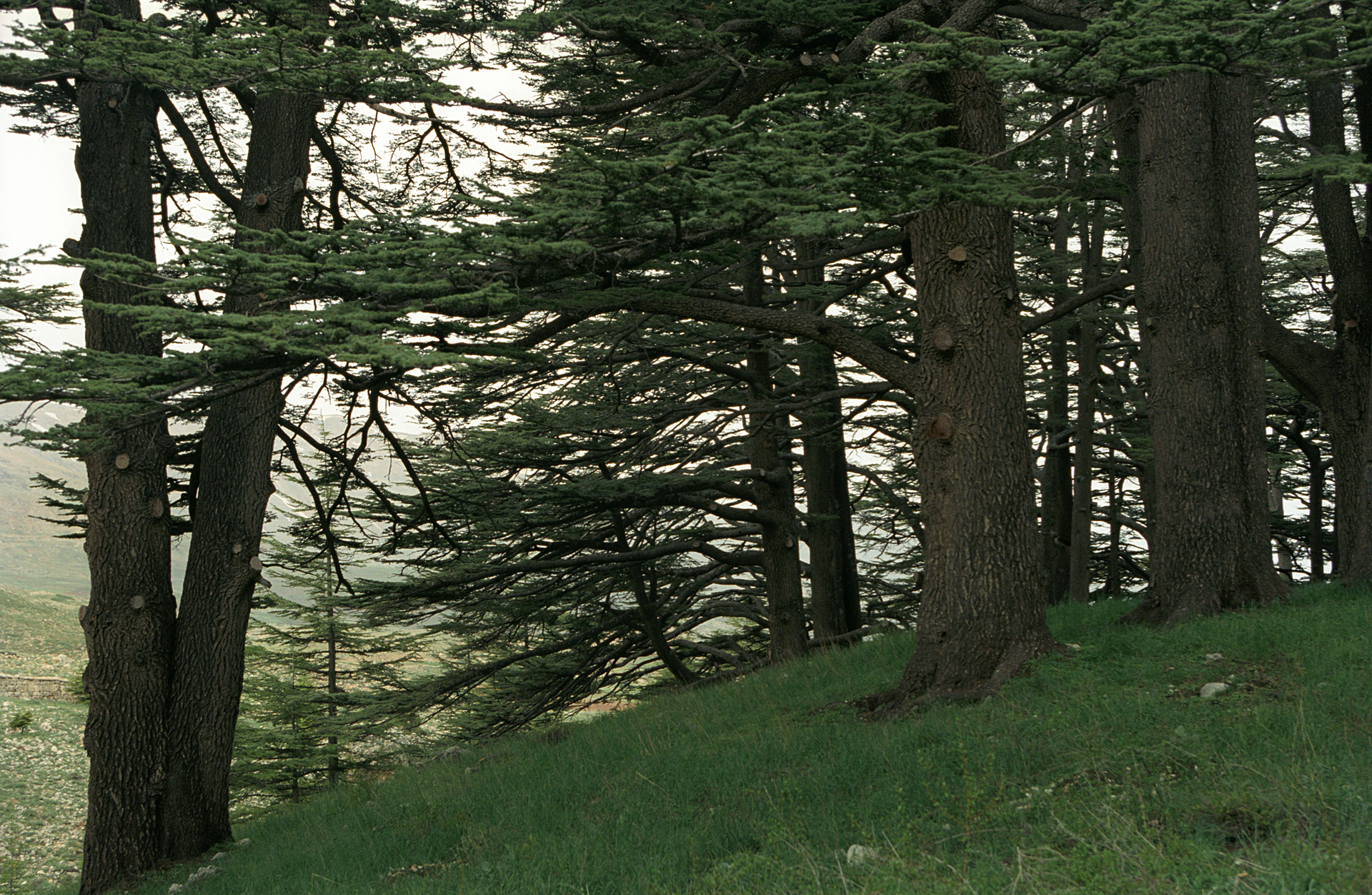

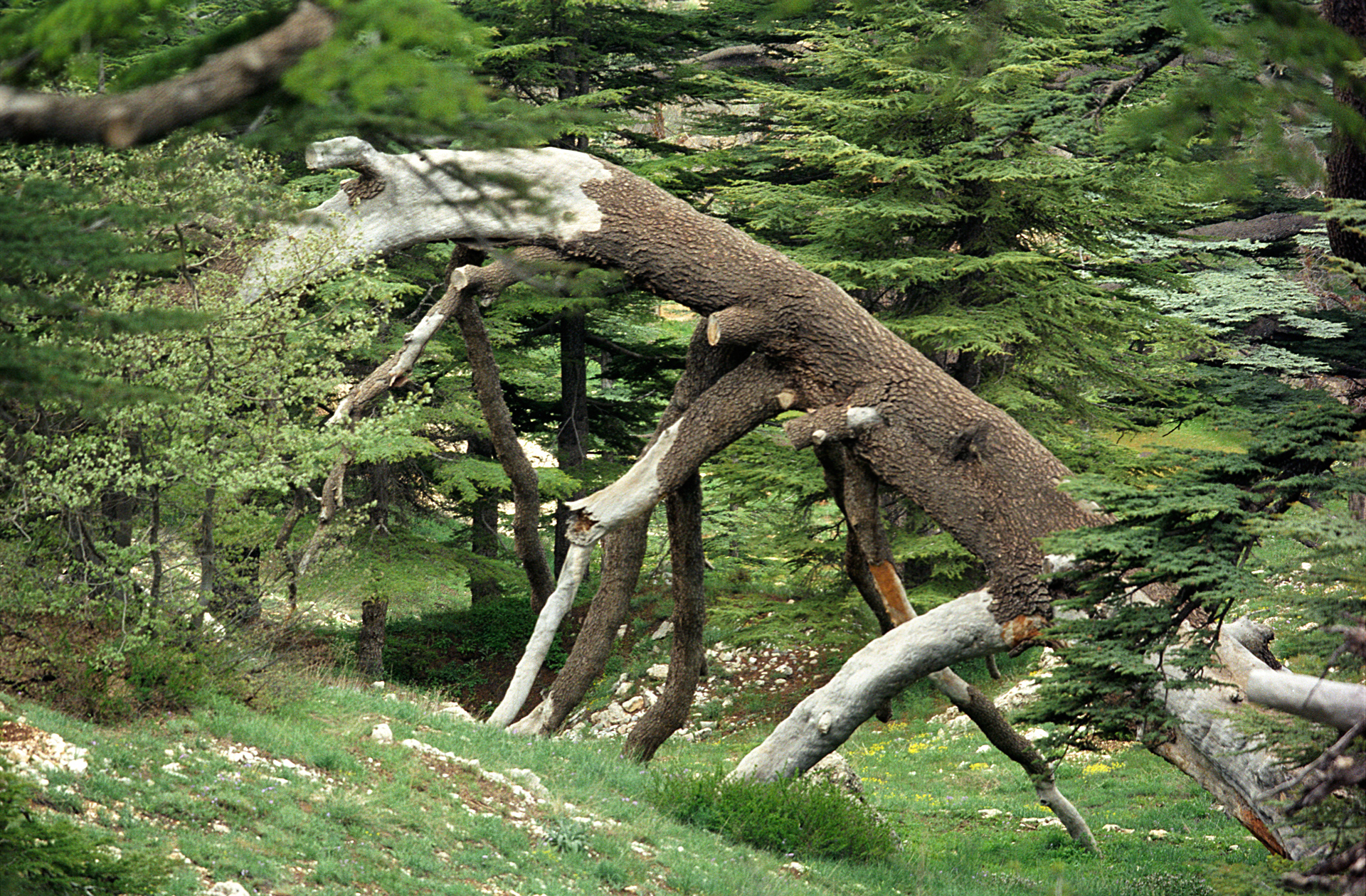

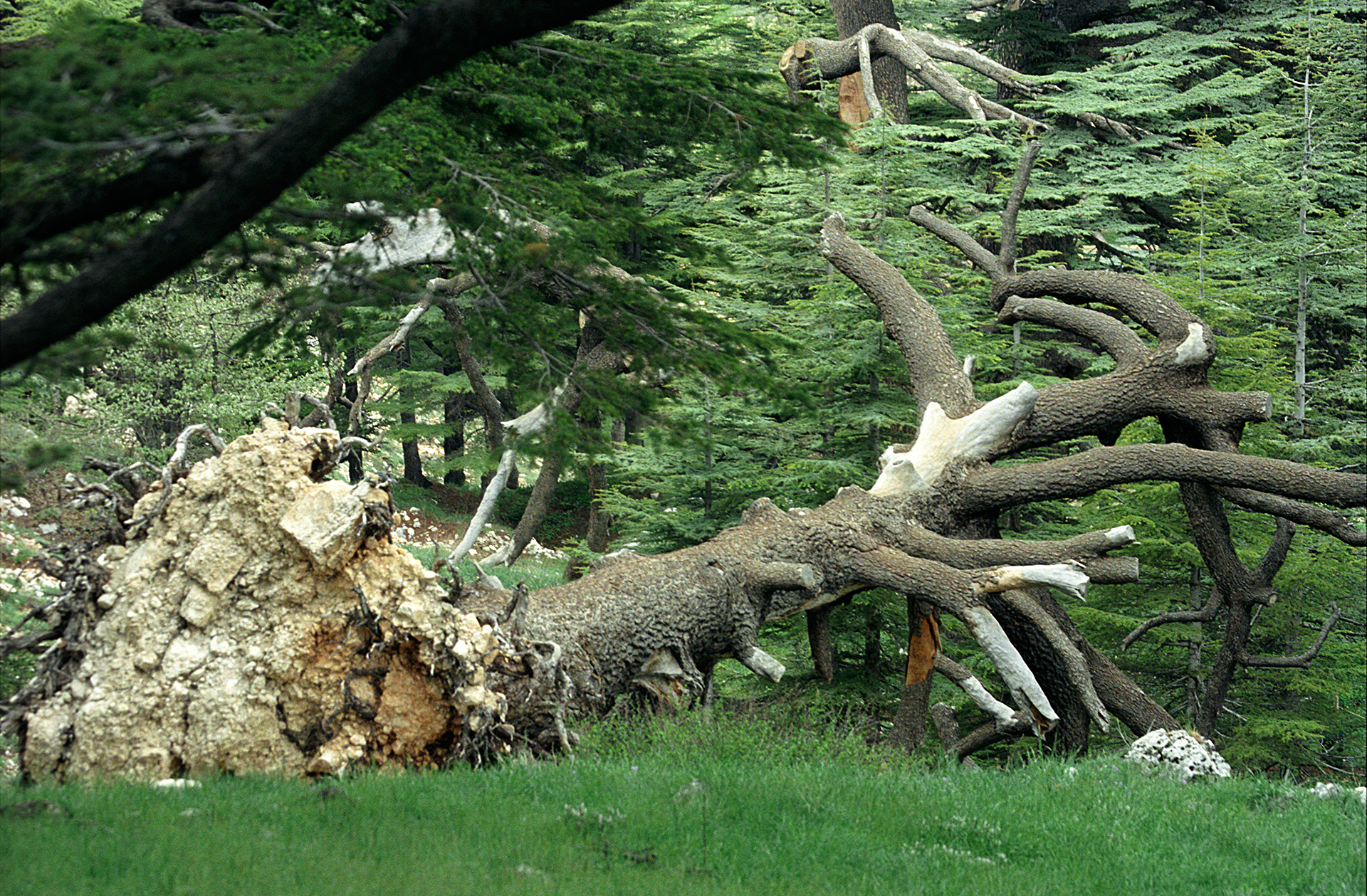

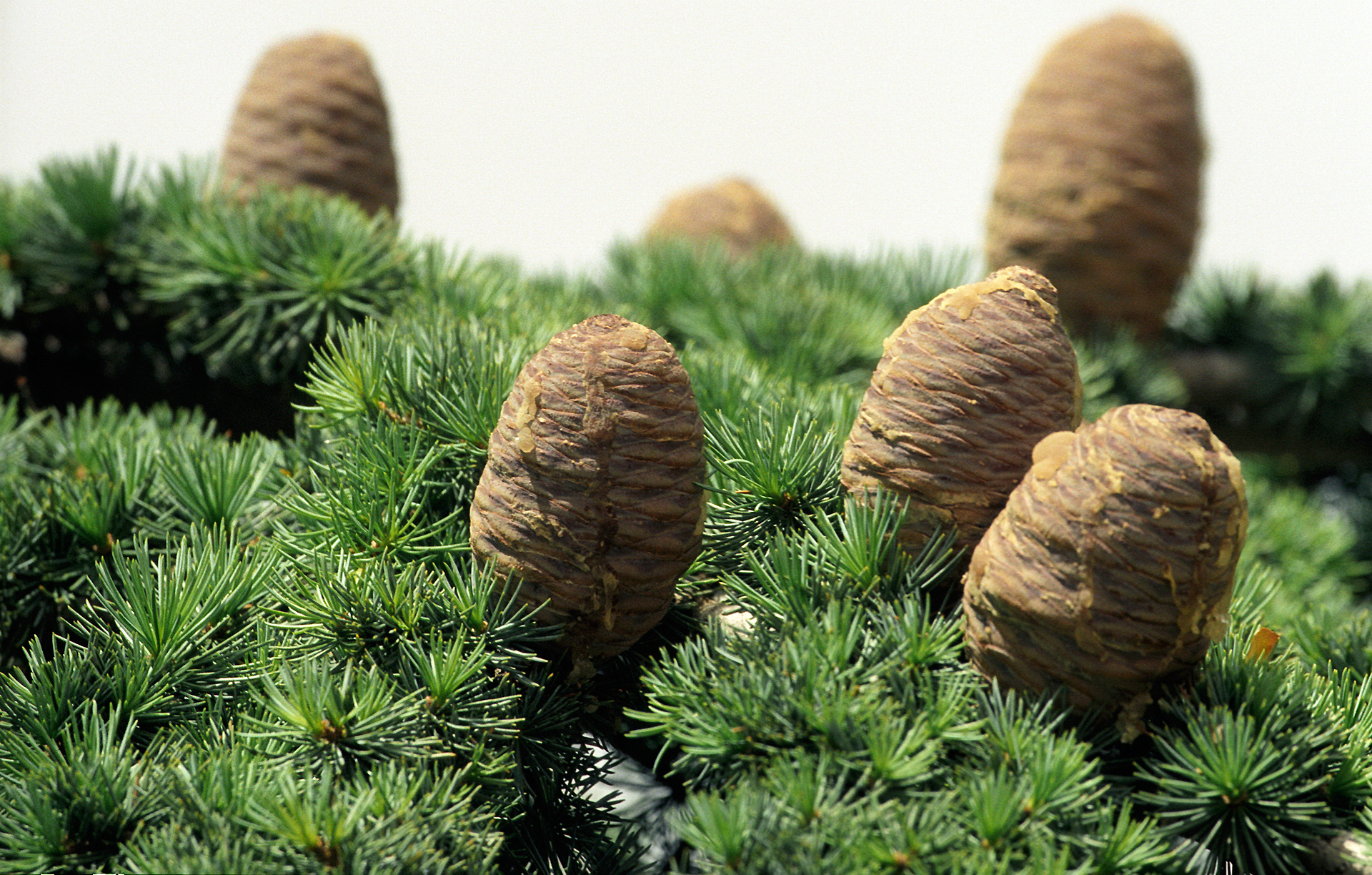

== See also ==
- Delmass Cave – Cave with medieval military fortifications in Lebanon
- Al Shouf Cedar Nature Reserve – Nature reserve in Lebanon

== Bibliography ==
- Hepper, F. Nigel (2001). "The Bsharré Cedars of Lebanon as seen by Travellers" (PDF). Archaeology & History in Lebanon (14): 96–105. Archived from the original (PDF) on 2023-09-12.
- Aiello, Anthony S., and Michael S. Dosmann. "The quest for the Hardy Cedar-of-lebanon.." Arnoldia: The magazine of the Arnold Arboretum 65.1 (2007): 26–35.
- Anderson, Mary Perle. "The Cedar of Lebanon." Torreya, vol. 8, no. 12, 1908, pp. 287–292. JSTOR, www.jstor.org/stable/40594656.
