= Orthosias in Phoenicia =

Phoenician town

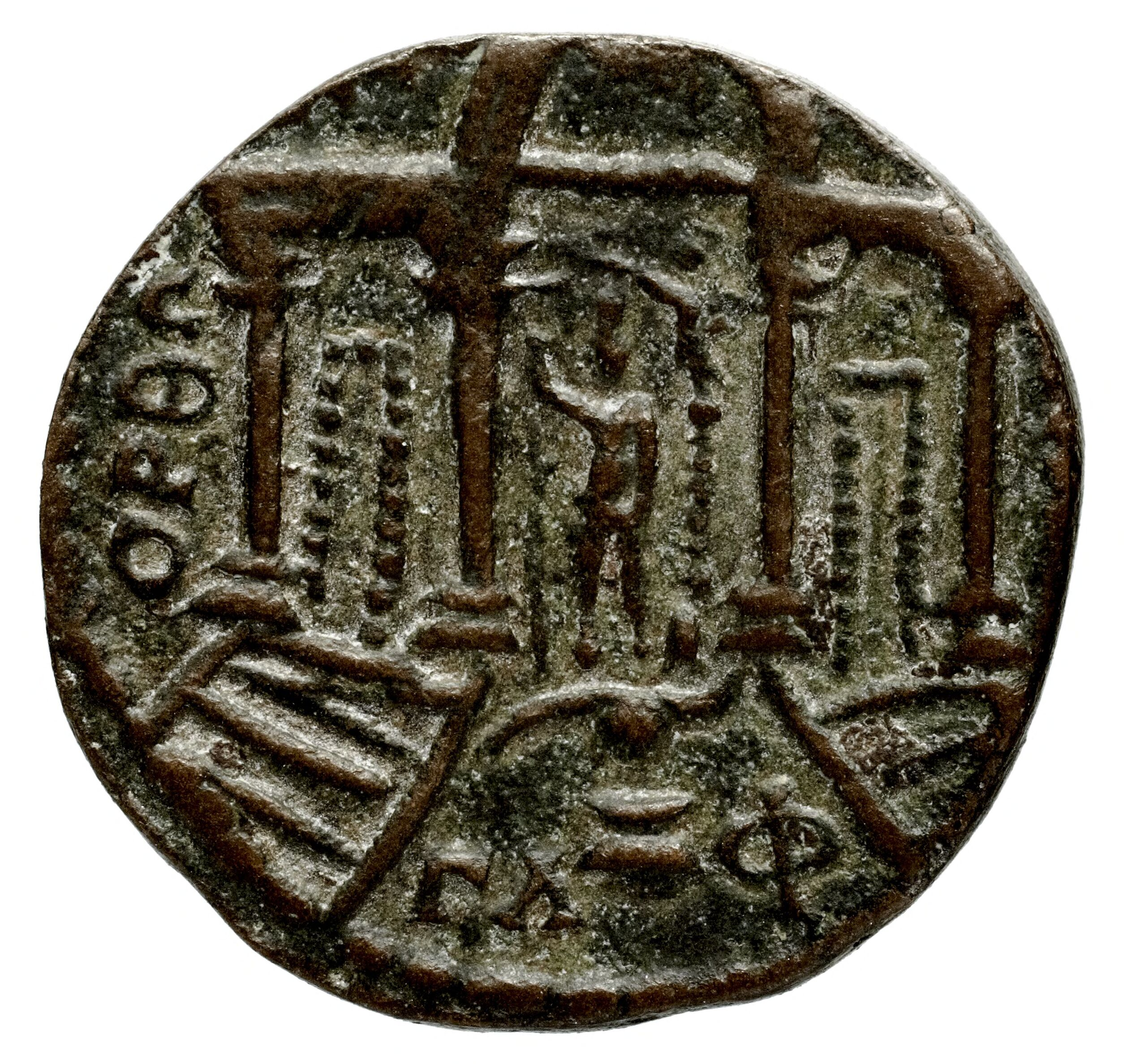
A coin of Orthosia, depicting the temple of Astarte and Astarte herself standing, with a river god of Nahr el bared under her foot

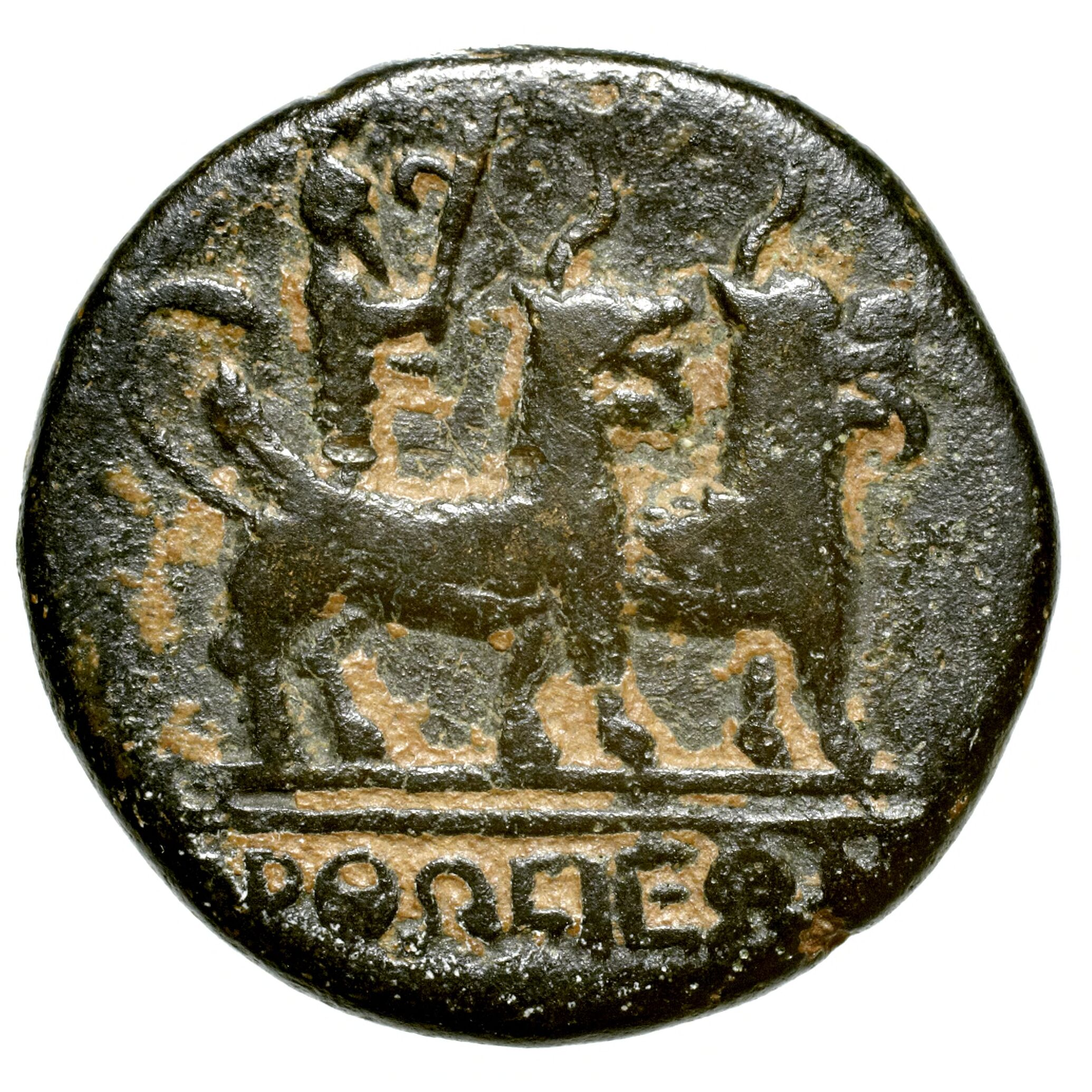
A coin of Orthosia

Orthosia (Ancient Greek: Ὀρθωσία) also known as Orthosias, and Orthosia in Phoenicia, was an ancient Phoenician town located on the coast of what is now modern-day Lebanon. Situated north of Tripolis (modern Tripoli) and south of the Eleutherus River (modern Nahr al-Kabir), its site is generally identified with the area of Ard Artous or Khan ard-Artusi, near the mouth of the Nahr el-Bared river. The town was mentioned in Ancient Egyptian records (as Ullasa), classical texts, and later in Crusader chronicles. In the late Roman era, it was located administratively in the Roman province of Phoenicia Prima, and was a bishopric that was a suffragan of Tyre.

The precise location of Orthosia remained uncertain for centuries and was only definitively identified in 2007 following events connected to the conflict at the Nahr el-Bared refugee camp.

== Etymology and identification ==
The name Orthosia (Ὀρθωσία) is of Greek origin. The site is often associated with the Bronze Age city of Ullasa (or Ullaza), which appears in Egyptian records, including the Amarna letters. The modern name of the area, Ard Artous (Arabic: أرض عرطوس, lit. 'Land of ʿartus'), and the nearby Mazraat Aartousi (Arabic: مزرعة عرطوسي, lit. 'Farm of ʿartusi') are believed to preserve the ancient name of Orthosia.

== Geographical context and classical references ==
Strabo, in his Geographica, consistently places Orthosia between the district of Simyra and the Eleutherus River, which he sometimes designates as the northern boundary of Phoenicia proper. He also provides various distance measurements, noting it was 3900 stadia from Pelusium and 1130 stadia from the Orontes River. Pliny the Elder, in his Natural History, lists Orthosia among other prominent Phoenician towns such as Byblos, Botrys, and Tripolis. Ptolemy, in his Geography, provides specific coordinates for Orthosia (67° 40′, 34° 20′), placing it geographically between Simyra and Tripolis. The Peutinger Table, an illustrated itinerarium of the Roman Empire, marks Orthosia (as "Ortosias") between Antaradus (modern Tartus) and Tripolis, noting a distance of 12 miles from Tripolis. Dionysius Periegetes also mentions "fertile Tripolis and Orthosia and Marathos" in his work, and agrees with Hierocles, George of Cyprus, and others, indicating its location between Tripoli and Antaradus. The city is mentioned in 1 Maccabees, 15:37, as a Phoenician port.

The discovery on the banks of the Eleutherus of Orthosian coins, dating from Antoninus Pius and bearing figures of Astarte, led to the identification of the site of Orthosias near the Nahr al-Bared river at a spot marked by ruins, called Bordj Hakmon el-Yehoudi.

== History ==
=== Bronze Age ===
As Ullasa, the site of Orthosia has a history stretching back to the Bronze Age. It was a strategically important port city that came under Egyptian influence. Records indicate that Thutmose III captured Ullasa, and it later featured in the Amarna letters, narrating its involvement in regional power struggles, including being taken by Arwad or Amurru.

=== Hellenistic and Roman Periods ===
The First Book of Maccabees (15:37) records that Trypho, a Seleucid usurper, fled by ship to Orthosia to escape from Antiochus VII Sidetes in 137 BC. Between the end of the first century BC and the first half of the first century AD, the town of Orthosia was not included in the list of Ituraean territories. Orthosia was a minting city during the Hellenistic and Roman periods, issuing coins during the Seleucid era, and Tetradrachms under the Roman Emperor Caracalla, the latter featuring distinctive mintmarks such as the "pilei" (conical caps associated with the Dioscuri) and an "idol", likely representing a local deity. Some coins also depict a grain ear, and Jupiter Optimus Maximus Heliopolitanus, a syncretic deity worshiped in the Great Temple of Baalbek. In the late Roman era, Orthosia was part of the province of Phoenicia Prima. The Roman city was destroyed by the 551 Beirut earthquake tsunami.

=== Crusader Era ===
In the medieval period, Orthosia was known as Artusia or Artusias. It is mentioned in the chronicles of the Crusades, particularly by William of Tyre in his Historia Rerum in Partibus Transmarinis Gestarum. The city was located near the Crusader castle of Arcas (in modern Tell Arqa). During the First Crusade, the crusader forces passed by Artusia in 1099 on their march from Arcas to Tripoli. It subsequently became part of the County of Tripoli.

=== Modern rediscovery ===
Archaeological investigation of Orthosia has been challenging due to coastal changes and modern development, including the establishment of the Nahr el-Barid Palestinian refugee camp there. Before definitive discovery, the identification of the site with Bordj Hakmon el-Yehoudi near the Nahr el-Barid river was supported by the discovery of Orthosian coins. he destruction caused by the sixth-century tsunami resulted in Orthosia disappearing from the historical and archaeological record for centuries. Thereafter, the city's location was known primarily through the discovery of Orthosian coins along the banks of the Nahr el-Bared river, which preserved evidence of its existence despite the absence of visible architectural remains. The definitive identification of Orthosia's remains occurred in 2007, during military operations and subsequent clearance work following armed clashes between the Lebanese army and Islamist groups in the Nahr el-Bared Palestinian refugee camp. After the destruction of the camp, bulldozing of the rubble exposed substantial Roman-period remains, confirming the presence of the ancient city beneath the modern settlement. Large-scale archaeological excavation was not pursued. An extensive excavation would have required the renewed displacement of Palestinian refugees who had already experienced displacement in 1948 and again in 2007. As a result, the remains of Orthosia were reburied beneath protective layers of tarpaulin and concrete while reconstruction of the refugee camp proceeded.

== Religious history ==
Local cults included the worship of Astarte, who is frequently depicted on Orthosian coinage, sometimes with a river god (likely representing the Nahr el-Barid) at her feet. Coins from the reign of Elagabalus show a temple dedicated to Astarte. There are also references to Isis-Artemis in connection with Tripolis/Orthosia in some papyri.

Orthosia became an early center of Christianity and was established as a bishopric, serving as a suffragan of Tyre within the ecclesiastical province of Phoenicia Prima. Le Quien mentions four bishops, beginning with Phosphorus in the fifth century. Two Latin titulars of the fourteenth century appear in Eubel. In the Notitiae Episcopatuum of Antioch for the 6th century

Several bishops of Orthosia are recorded as having participated in significant early Church councils including Phosphorus who attended the Council of Chalcedon in 451 AD; Nilus, who was present at the Second Council of Constantinople in 536 AD; Stephen who participated in the Second Council of Constantinople in 553 AD; and Gelasios who is also mentioned in historical records as a bishop of Orthosia.

The city is also mentioned in the Pseudo-Clementine Homilies as a place visited by Clement of Rome.
