= Mount Safi =

Mountain range in the region of Southern Lebanon

- Jabal Sâfi جبل صافي (Arabic)
- Location within Lebanon

Highest point
- Elevation: 1,379 m (4,524 ft)
- Prominence: 222 m (728 ft)
- Coordinates: 33°29′6.241″N 35°32′40.214″E

Geography
- Location: Mohafazat Liban-Sud, Lebanon
- Parent range: Mount Lebanon

Mount Safi, also known as Jabal Safi (جبل صافي) is a mountain located in the southernmost part of the Mount Lebanon mountain range. It has an elevation of at least 1,300 meters, with a prominence of around 222 meters. The mountain is north of the Lebanese city of Nabatieh as well.

== Name ==
The name of the mountain, Safi, is derived from the local tradition that the prophet Zephaniah (Safiniah in Arabic) was buried on the mountain, hence the name Safi.

== Geography ==
=== Position ===
The mountain is located in the south of Lebanon in the Mohafazat Liban-Sud region. The elevation of the mountain is around 1379 meters, with a prominence of at least 222 meters. Mount Safi is part of the Lebanese portion of mountain ranges within the Levant. 21 kilometres away from the mountain is the border which divides Israel from Lebanon.

=== Localities ===
Mount Safi has four localities in its proximity, which are the villages of Jbaa, Mlikh, Ain Bousouar and Ain Qana. The mountain's location is north of the city of Nabatieh.

=== Strategic importance ===
Due to its close proximity to the border dividing Israel and Lebanon, the Islamist paramilitary group Hezbollah used the location as a site to launch missiles against Israel.

== Arab-Israeli conflict ==
=== Cold War ===
According to a 1998 letter addressed to the United Nations, the localities around Mount Safi and its surroundings were intercepted, airstriked and came under artillery fire by the Israeli forces within February of that year.

=== After 1998 ===
The Hezbollah paramilitary group used parts of the mountain to fire anti-aircraft missiles into Israeli territory, taking advantage of the mountain's close proximity to the border. On the 28th of June 2024, Israeli forces launched several airstrikes on Mount Safi, which was reportedly a defensive move against the Hezbollah. The airstrikes damaged several villages within the locality of the mountain and killed four people, including a Hezbollah militant.

== See also ==
- List of mountains in Lebanon
