= List of rivers of Lebanon =

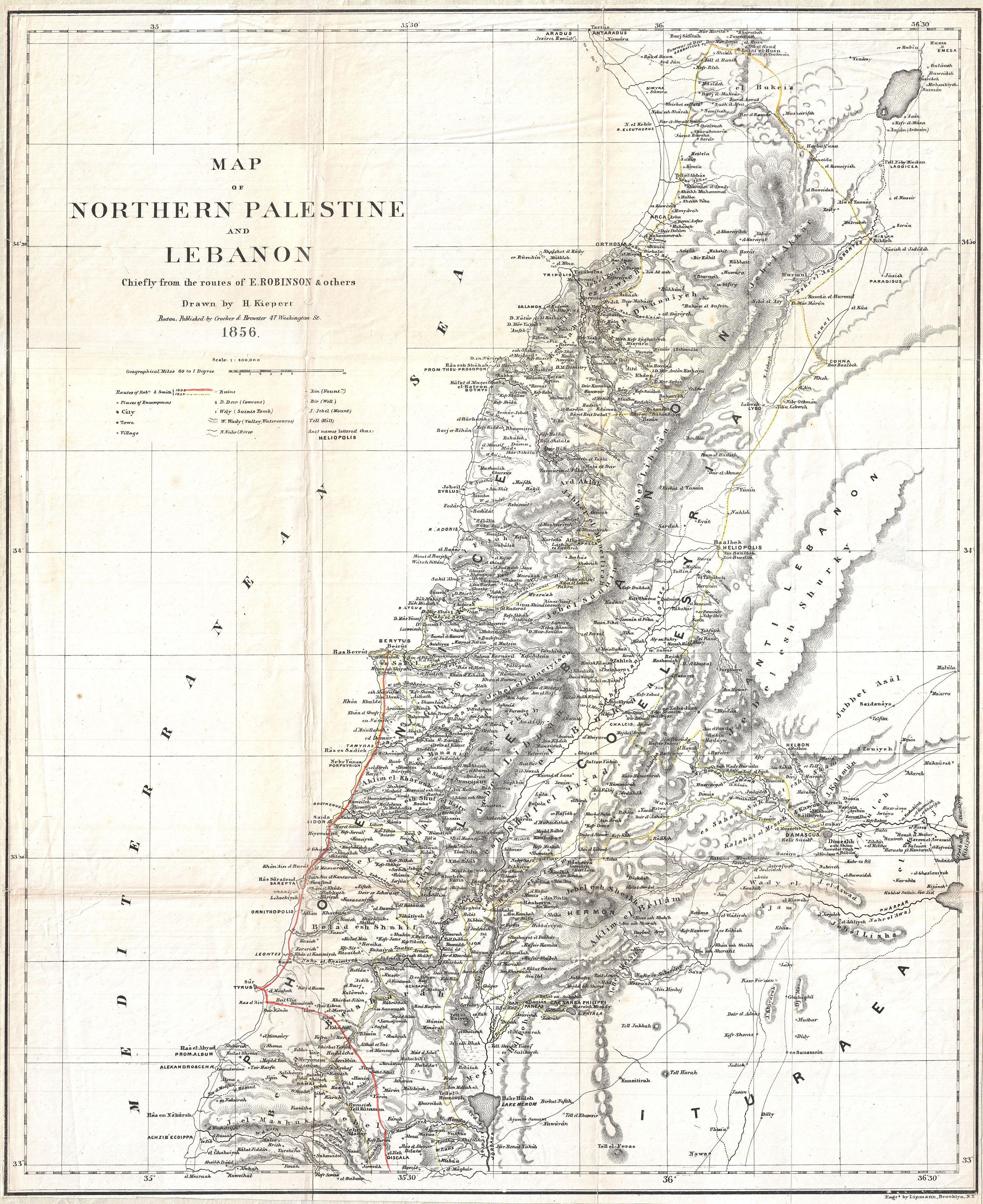
19th century map of Lebanon and northern Palestine with modern and ancient names of rivers

This is a list of waterways named as rivers in Lebanon. Lebanon has 22 rivers all of which are non-navigable; 28 rivers originate on the western face of the Lebanon range and run through the steep gorges and into the Mediterranean Sea, the other 6 arise in the Beqaa Valley.

Rivers originating on the western face of the Lebanon Mountains
Modern name	Other names	Ancient name	Notes
Nahr al-Kabir	Nahr al-Kabir al-Janoubi	Eleutherus	Marks ancient boundary between Phoenicia and Syria
Ostouene River			
Nahr Ghadir			
Arqa River			
Nahr al-Bared			
Kadisha River	Nahr Abu Ali		
Nahr al-Jaouz			
Nahr Ibrahim	Nahr Brahim	Adonis	Associated with the Adonis myth; site of fertility cults
Nahr al-Kalb	Dog River	Lycus (Greek: Λύκος, “wolf river”)	Famous for inscriptions left by conquerors from Ramses II to the Allied forces
Beirut River	Nahr Beirut	Magoras	Flows through Beirut; mentioned in classical geography
Damour River	Nahr Al Damour	Damoros, Tamyras	South of Beirut; noted in Roman texts
Awali River		Bostrenus, Asclepius	Near Sidon; linked to healing cults of the Temple of Eshmun
Siniq River			
Zahrani River			
Jaouz River			

Rivers originating in the Lebanese hinterland
Modern name	Other names	Ancient name	Notes
Litani River	Qasimiyeh River	Leontes (Greek: Λεόντης, “lion river”)	Longest river entirely in Lebanon; vital for irrigation
Asi River		Orontes	
Hasbani River	Upper Jordan River		

== See also ==
- List of mountains in Lebanon
