= Mount Sannine =

Mountain in Lebanon

Coordinates: 33.95°N 35.88°E

Mount Sannine جبل صنين
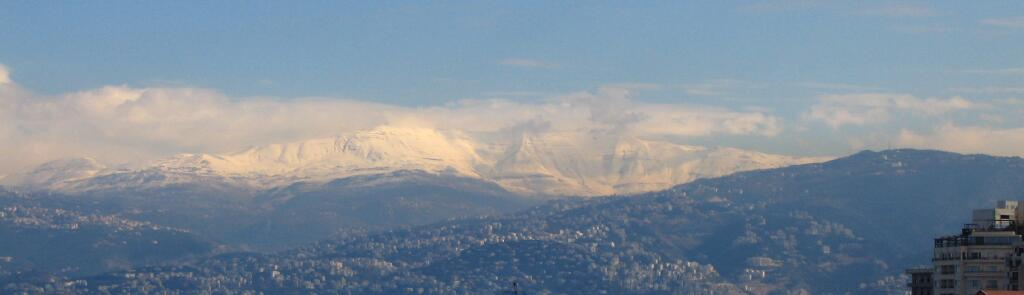
- Mount Sannine as seen from Beirut

Highest point
- Elevation: 2,628 m (8,622 ft)

Geography
- Location: Lebanon
- Parent range: Mount Lebanon range

Mount Sannine (Arabic: جبل صنين / ALA-LC: Jabal Șannīn) is a mountain in the Mount Lebanon range. Its highest point is 2,628 m (8,622 feet) above sea level in Lebanon. Mount Sannine, which has a base of limestone, is the source of many mountain springs. There is an old 4th-century Christian church situated at the peak of the mountain. The city of Beirut and the Mediterranean Sea can be seen from the top of the mountain.

With a prominence of 801 meters, it ranks as the 8th most prominent peak in the Levant Ranges and the 3rd in Lebanon.

== Tourism ==
The mountain features diverse trails ranging from easy to challenging, with some routes taking approximately 3 hours to reach the summit. From the summit visitors can see a view of Beirut, the Mediterranean Sea and surrounding landscapes. During winter time People come for some skiing, snowboarding, and snowshoeing.

== See also ==
- List of mountains in Lebanon
