= Aarid Maql Saab =

Mountain of northern Lebanon

- Location within Lebanon

Highest point
- Prominence: 1,462 m (4,797 ft)
- Coordinates: 34°29′29″N 36°16′33″E

Geography
- Location: Lebanon

Aarid Maql Saab is a mountain located in northern Lebanon, specifically in the Akkar District of Mohafazat AakkârIt. t has an elevation of 1,462 meters (4,797 feet) above sea level.

== Geographic Significance ==
The mountain that is part of the Mount Lebanon range, which stretches along the western part of Lebanon. Aarid Maql Saab is the 17th highest peak out of 320 mountains in the Akkar District.

== Hiking ==
the mountain is a destination for hikers, as evidenced by the existence of hiking trails and routes to its summit.

== See also ==
- List of mountains in Lebanon
