= Jabal Al Rihane Biosphere Reserve =

- Location within Lebanon

Jabal Al Rihane Biosphere Reserve is an area of protected "evergreen sclerophylic broussailles and forests" in Southern Lebanon, Lebanon. Established in 2007 It includes several peaks between 1,200 and 1,360 meters high and covers an area of 18,430 hectares and is administered by the Ministry of Environment. The reserve features Oak trees that are up to 500 years old.

Latitude 33° 27′ 01.17″ N; Longitude 35° 33′ 47.17″ E. It is bordered by the Litani River to the south, Mzairaa in the north, and the Jezzine and Niha villages. Parts of the preserve overlook the Beqaa Valley to the east and the Mediterranean Sea to the west.

== Conservation and Management ==
Jabal Al Rihane is part of the UNESCO World Network of Biosphere Reserves (WNBR). Along with the Shouf and Jabal Moussa biosphere reserves, it forms an ecological corridor along Lebanon's mountainous spine. This designation has helped promote sustainability principles and practices in the local area.

== See also ==
- List of mountains in Lebanon
