= Nahr Al-Bared (river) =

نهر البارد

Location
- Country: Lebanon

Physical characteristics
- Source
  - elevation: 1180
- Mouth: Mediterranean Sea
  - coordinates: 34°30′45″N 35°57′16″E
- Length: 31 km (19 mi)

Nahr al-Bared is one of the three rivers in the Akkar District of North Lebanon. It is fed by springs in the mountains and runs for 31 km and passes along the southern side of Nahr al-Bared refugee camp before reaching the Mediterranean Sea. The river waters are used for agricultural irrigation and for sewage discharge, as well as municipal waste.

== See also ==
- Rivers of Lebanon
