= Sayniq River =

Coordinates: 33°32′12″N 35°21′40″E

The Sayniq River (Arabic: نهر سينيق, romanized: Nahr Saynīq) is a river in Lebanon. It is located to the south of Saida. It originates from the spring of Em Chammas in Berti near Jezzine, and flows into the Mediterranean. It is 23 km in length, and extends from Safi and Rihane mountains at 662 m above sea level.

The Sayniq River, along with other water bodies in the region, plays a crucial role in the water security of South Lebanon, managed by the South Lebanon Water Establishment (SLWE).
