= List of mountains in Lebanon =

Mountains of Lebanon
Tallest mountains of Lebanon
- Above 3,000 m
- 2500–3000m
- 2000–2499m
- 1500–1999m
- 1000–1500m
- Not specified/less than 1000m
1 Aarid Maql Saab
2 Jabal Akkar
3 Jabal al-Makmel
4 Jabal al-Mnaitra
5 Jabal Sannine
6 Jabal al-Knayseh
7 Al-Barouk
8 Jabal Niha
9 Jabal Safi
10 Jabal al-Rihane
11 Jabal Amel
12 Jabal al-Shaykh

The geomorphology of Lebanon consists of the coastal plain, the western mountain range (Mount Lebanon), an interior valley (the Beqaa Valley), and the eastern mountain range (the Anti-Lebanon). Lebanese mountains exceeding elevations of 1,500 metres (4,900 ft) above sea level constitute 22% of the country's total land area. The Mount Lebanon range stretches from the northern region of Jabal Akkar southward, reaching elevations of 3,088 m (10,131 ft) at Qurnat as Sawda, Mount Makmel's highest peak, down to 1,091 m (3,579 ft) further south. The hills of Jabal Amel begin after Jabal Niha. This total length of the Mount Lebanon range is 160 km (99 mi) with a width ranging from 45 km (28 mi) in its northern section, and 25 km (16 mi) in its central part. Numerous smaller hills create a transitional zone between the sea and the peaks. The western face of the Mount Lebanon range features a series of narrow valleys that run parallel to each other, sloping westward towards the sea, and channeling various watercourses. The eastern slopes descend toward the Beqaa Valley and are steeper compared to their western counterparts. During winter, seasonal rivers emerge from the western face snowmelt. The Anti-Lebanon mountain range begins in Yanta and ends in Shebaa, and measure more than 100 km (62 mi) long and 30 km (19 mi) wide. Unlike Mount Lebanon, the Anti-Lebanon is devoid of deep valleys. This page contains a sortable table listing mountains of Lebanon in both the eastern and western mountain ranges.

== List ==
Mountains in Lebanon
Mountain	Height (m)	Height (ft)	Coordinates	Range	Governorate	Notes
Jabal al-Makmel (Mount Makmel)	3,088	10,131	34.301272°N 36.115134°E	Mount Lebanon	North and Baalbek-Hermel	Highest peak: Qurnat as Sawda
Jabal al-Mnaitra (Mount Mnaitra)	2,911	9,547	34.075102°N 35.8792225°E	Mount Lebanon	Keserwan-Jbeil	
Jabal esh-Sheikh (Mount Hermon)	2,814	9,232	33.4247255°N 35.8614104°E	Anti-Lebanon Mountains	Nabatieh	Highest peak: Sharet Haramoun (aka Qasr Antar)
Jabal Sannine (Mount Sannine)	2,695	8,839	33.95017°N 35.87857°E	Mount Lebanon	Mount Lebanon and Beqaa	
Jabal al-Knayseh (Mount Knayseh)	2,093	6,868	33.8454671°N 35.7987422°E	Mount Lebanon	Mount Lebanon and Beqaa	
Jabal al-Barouk (Mount Barouk)	1,930	6,332	33.7263242°N 35.7190146°E	Mount Lebanon	Mount Lebanon	
Jabal Niha (Mount Niha)	1,809	5,938.	33.5666658°N 35.6230336°E	Mount Lebanon	Mount Lebanon	
Jabal Akkar	1,748	5,735	34.4130819°N 36.0843154°E	Mount Lebanon	Akkar, North and Baalbek-Hermel	
Jabal al-Rihane (‘Arid Zannar)	~1,400	~4,593	33.4456788°N 35.5519397°E	Mount Lebanon	South	
Jabal Safi (Mount Saphon) (Note: Also Sapanu, Zaphon.)	1,300	4,265	33.5106008°N 35.4497278°E	Mount Lebanon	South and Beqaa	
Jabal Amil (Mount Amil)			33.1666658°N 35.356367°E	Mount Lebanon	Nabatieh	
Aarid Maql Saab	1462		34°29′29″N 36°16′33″E	Mount Lebanon	North	

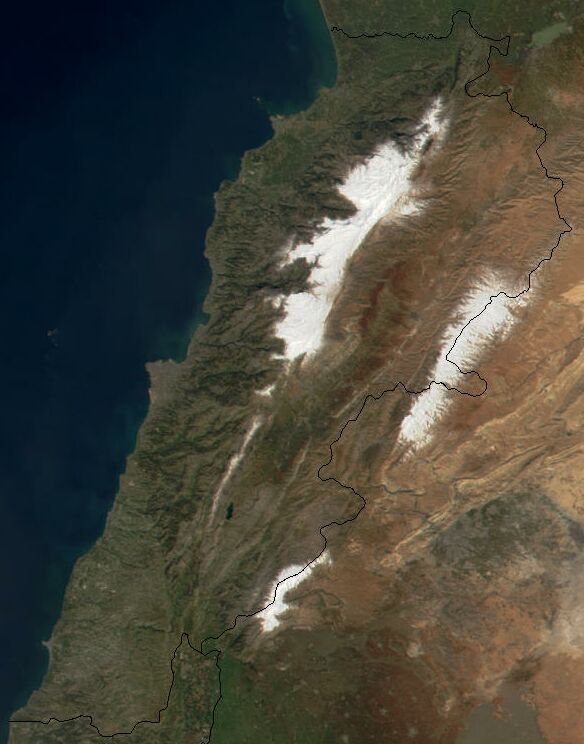
Satellite image of Lebanon showing snow-covered prominences

== See also ==
- List of rivers of Lebanon
