= Qurnat as Sawda' =

Highest mountain in Lebanon

Qurnat as Sawdā
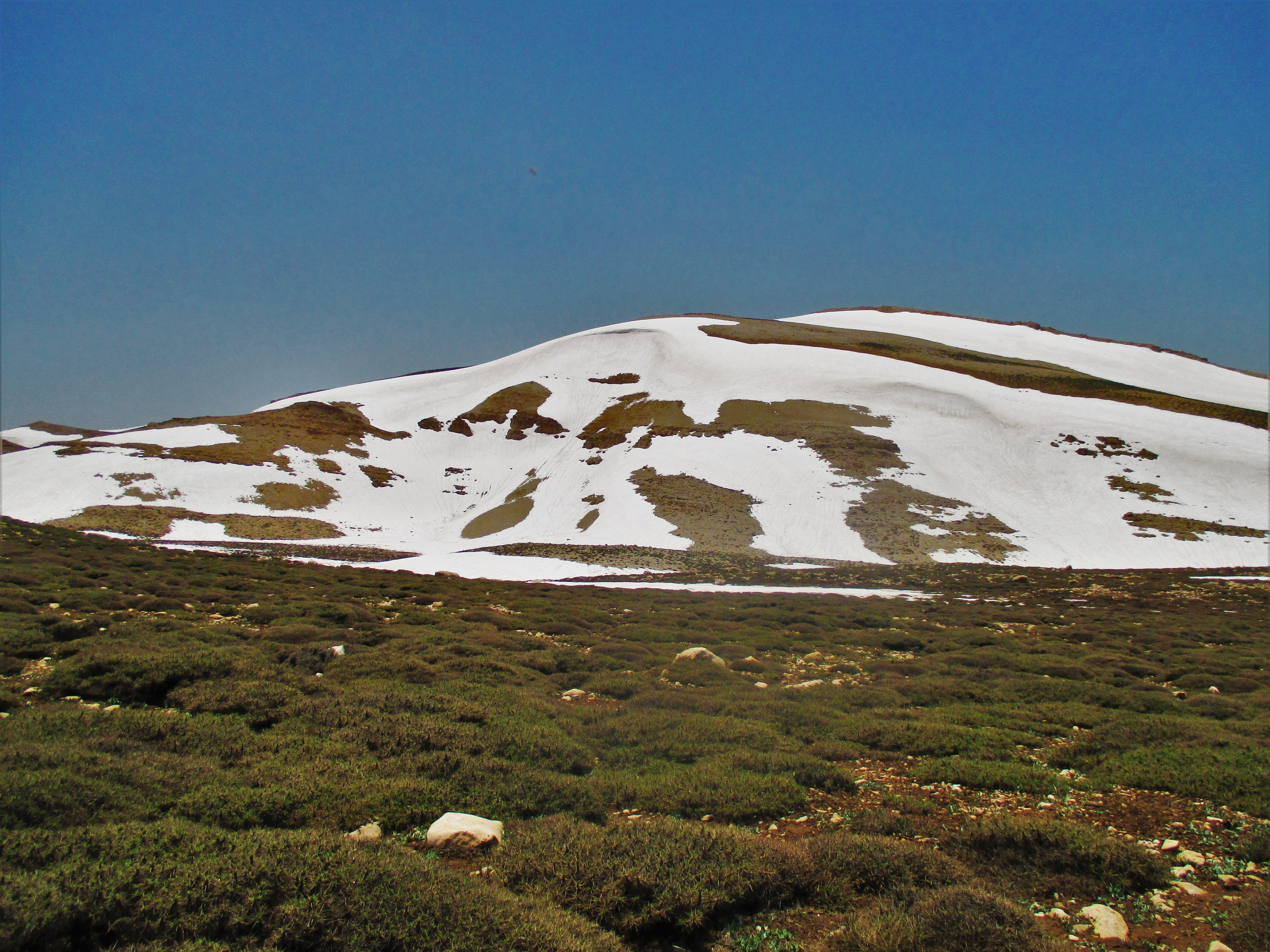
- Qurnat As Sawda

Highest point
- Elevation: 3,088 m (10,131 ft)
- Prominence: 2,393 m (7,851 ft)
- Listing: Country high point Ultra, Ribu
- Coordinates: 34°18′00″N 36°07′00″E

Naming
- Native name: القرنة السوداء (Arabic)

Geography
- Location within Lebanon
- Parent range: Jabal Al-Makmel Bsharri North Lebanon

Qurnat as Sawdā (Arabic: القرنة السوداء) is the highest point in Lebanon and the Levant, at 3,088 m (10,131 ft) above sea level. It is the summit of Jabal al Makmel, a mountain range in Bsharri District, North Lebanon.

== Etymology ==
The mountain's name derives from the Classical Syriac ܩܪܢܬ ܣܗܕ̈ܐ (Qornet Sohde), for "Martyrs' Peak". Its name, like many other local toponyms, was retained even after the decline of Syriac as a vernacular tongue in the region. However, the name changed during the transition to Arabic in Lebanon and became known as القرنة السوداء (Qurnat as Sawda') meaning "The Black Corner".

== Topography ==
Qurnat as Sawda is part of the western Lebanese mountain range more specifically the Makmel mountain range and is a limestone and dolomite massif. The mountain has several peaks, with the highest one being the summit, the fascinating nature of the peak is the result of a subarctic climate with year round snow reserves called névés its temperature remains cold even in the summer.

== Climate ==
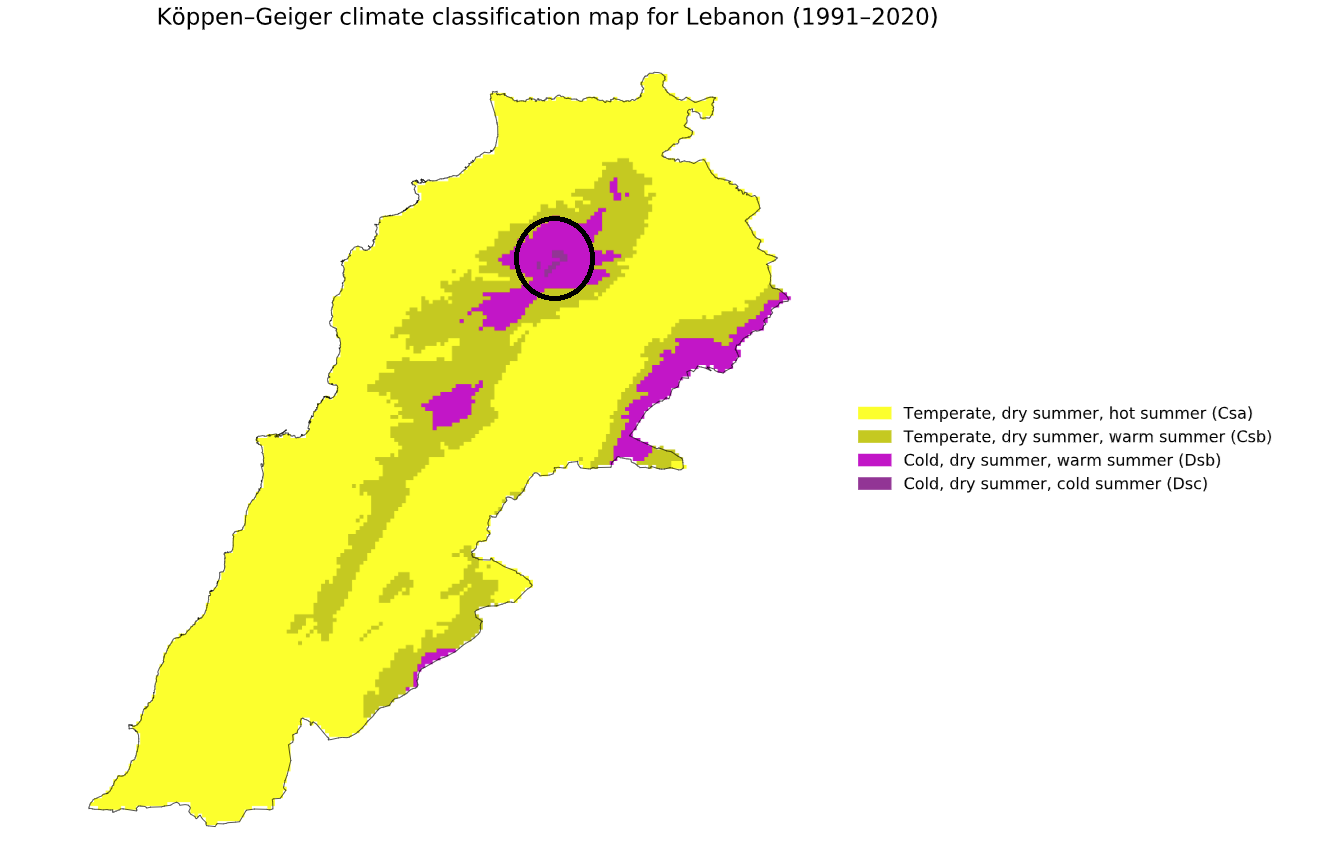
Koppen climate classification of Lebanon, where Qurnat as Sawda is inside the black circle.

Qurnat as Sawda has a Mediterranean-influenced subarctic climate (Köppen: Dsc), experiencing warm to cool dry summers, and cold snowy winters. The area receives significant annual precipitation, especially during the winter months, averaging between 1100–1400 mm. In some years, against odds, remnants of snow can persist through the summer months.Uninhibited Wind Exposure: Positioned atop an isolated, high-altitude plateau, the summit lacks natural windbreaks or forest canopy. Constant, high-velocity westerly and northerly winds drive down perceived temperatures through rapid convective cooling and wind chill.

== Biodiversity ==
The mountain is home to several unique plant and animal species, some of which are endemic to the region. It is also an important site for birdwatching, with several species of raptors, such as the golden eagle, spotted in the area.

== Hiking and tourism ==
Qurnat al Sawda is a popular destination for hikers and mountaineers, with several hiking trails leading to the summit. The area also attracts tourists who come to admire the stunning views of the surrounding landscape, including the Mediterranean Sea and the Bekaa Valley. There are also several villages and towns in the vicinity, such as Jird 40, Beqaasefrine, Bsharri, Syr and others which offer accommodations and services for visitors.

== References in medieval religious literature ==
In Jacobus de Voragine's Golden Legend, the summit of Mount Lebanon (Qurnat as Sawda') is the site on which Noah, after having survived the flood, replanted a sacred tree. Voragine states that the tree's seeds were given to Seth by an angel in the Garden of Eden and placed in Adam's mouth upon his death so that his blood could feed its growth.

== See also ==
- List of mountains in Lebanon
- List of ultras of West Asia
- Folk etymology
