= Mount Lebanon =

Mountain range in Lebanon

- جبل لبنان
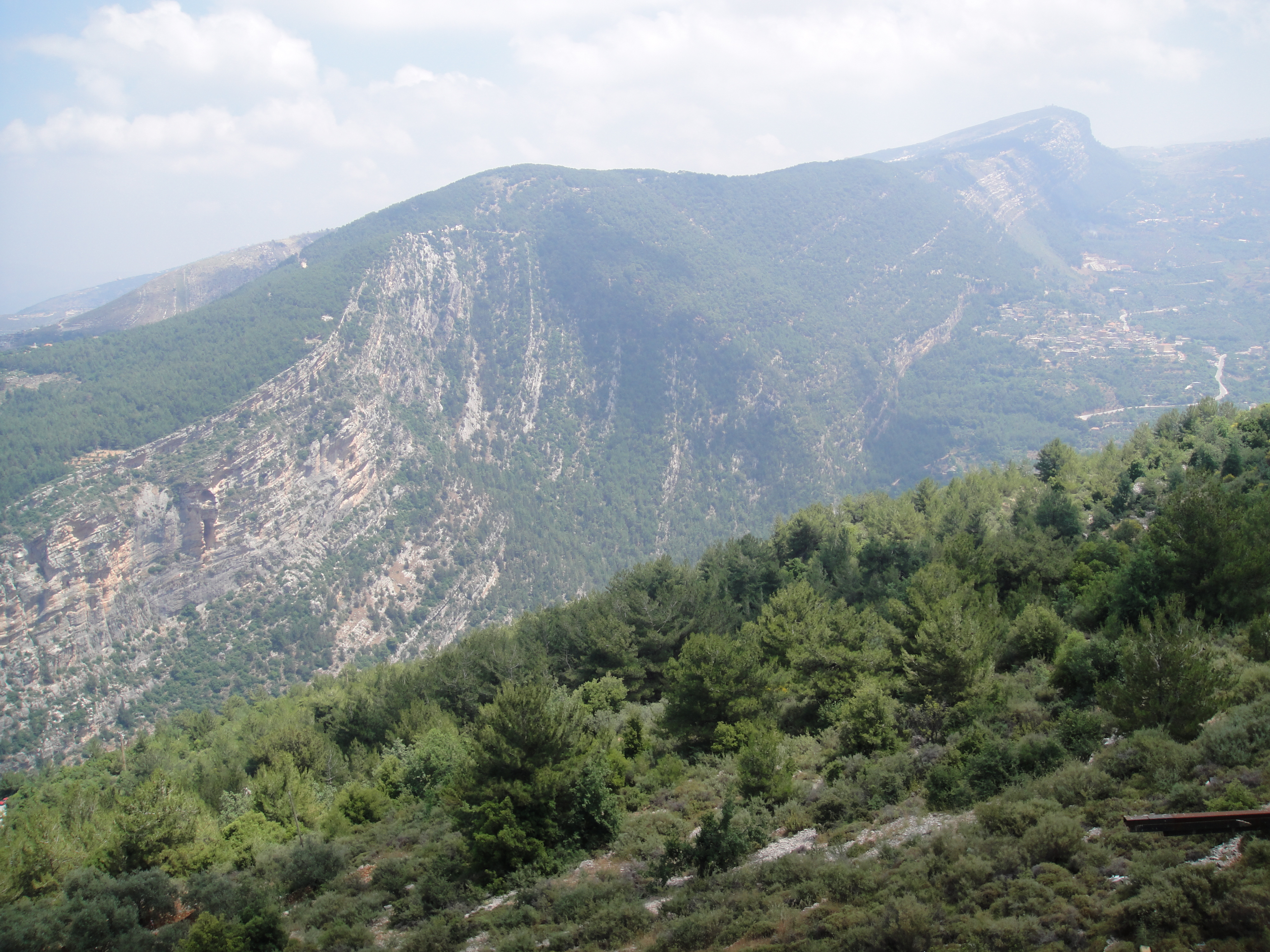
- Mount Lebanon in the Bsharri District

Highest point
- Peak: Qurnat as Sawda'
- Elevation: 3,088 m (10,131 ft)
- Coordinates: 34°18′03″N 36°06′57″E

Geography
- Location within Lebanon
- Location: Lebanon

Climbing
- Easiest route: Scramble

Mount Lebanon (Note: Arabic: جَبَل لُبْنَان, romanized: jabal lubnān, Lebanese Arabic pronunciation: [ˈʒabal ləbˈneːn]; Syriac: ܛܘܪ ܠܒ݂ܢܢ, romanized: ṭūr leḇnān, Western Syriac pronunciation: [tˤur lewˈnɔn]; Latin: Libanus) is a mountain range in Lebanon. It is about 170 km (110 mi) long and averages above 2,500 m (8,200 ft) in elevation, with its peak at 3,088 m (10,131 ft). The range provides a typical alpine climate year-round.

Mount Lebanon is well-known for its snow-covered mountains, home to surviving Lebanese cedar forests and diverse high-altitude flora and fauna. The name Lebanon itself originates from the white, snow-covered tops of this mountain range.

== Geography ==
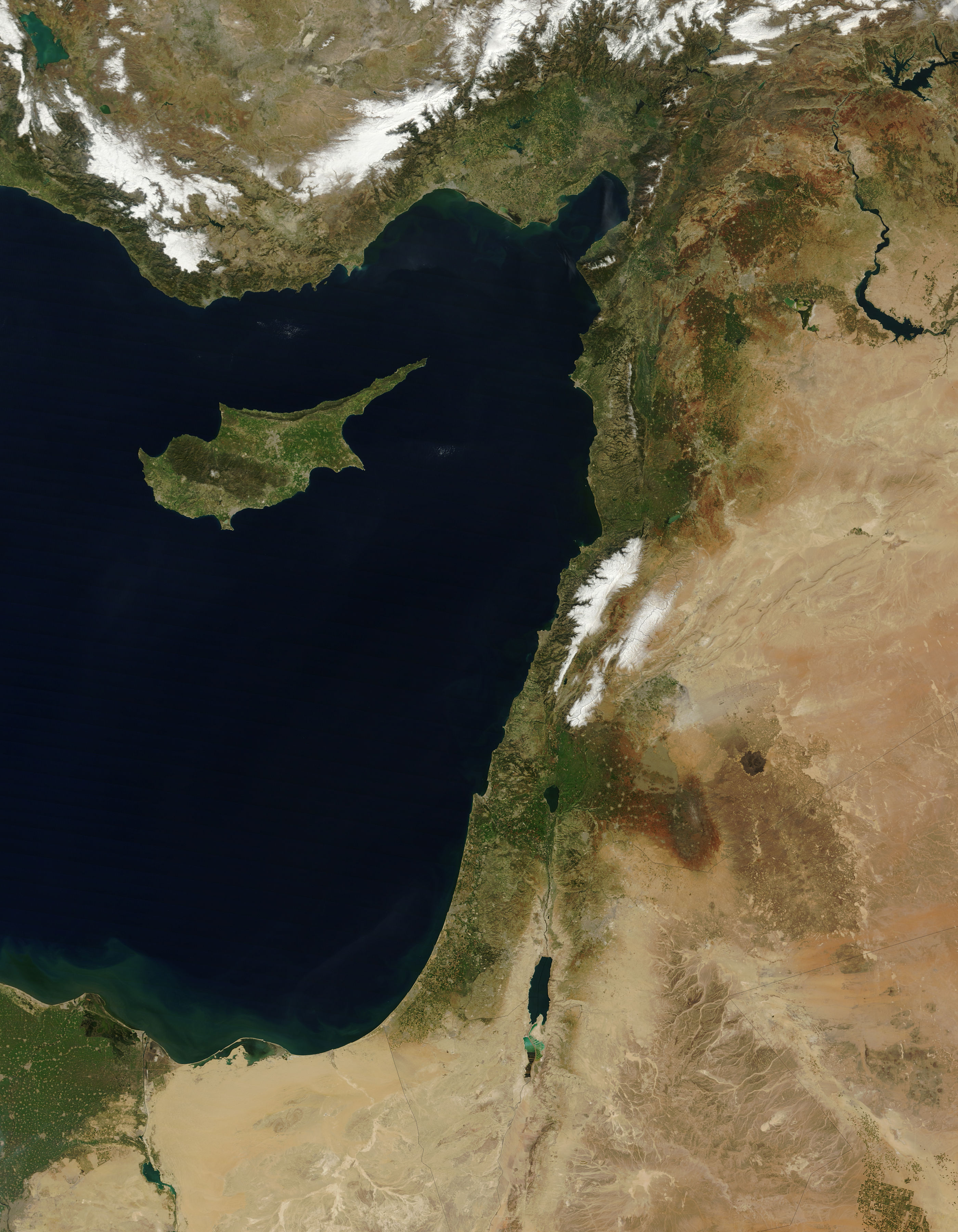
Satellite map of the Levant, showing the snow-capped Mount Lebanon.

The Mount Lebanon range extends along the entire country for about 170 km (110 mi), parallel to the Mediterranean coast. The highest peak is Qurnat as Sawda', at 3,088 m (10,131 ft). The range receives a substantial amount of precipitation, including snow, which averages around 4 m (13 ft) in depth. The Mount Lebanon range is bordered to the east by the Beqaa Valley, which separates it from the Anti-Lebanon Mountains further east.

Lebanon has historically been defined by the mountains, which provided protection for the local population. In Lebanon, changes in scenery are related less to geographical distances than to altitudes. The mountains were known for their oak and pine forests. The last remaining old growth groves of the famous Cedar of Lebanon (Cedrus libani var. libanii) are on the high slopes of Mount Lebanon, in the Cedars of God World Heritage Site.

The Phoenicians used the forests of Mount Lebanon to build their ships enabling trade with their neighbors. The most notable example is the First Temple built by King Solomon who used cedar wood sent by Hiram of Tyre. Phoenicians and successor rulers consistently replanted and restocked the range; even as late as the 16th century, the forested area was considerable.

Despite its mountainous terrain, Mount Lebanon was historically closely connected to the surrounding regions of Syria through trade and transportation. The mountain did not produce sufficient wheat, and staple grain was therefore imported from areas including the Beqaa Valley and the Hawran. Products from Mount Lebanon, particularly silk, were in turn sold in regional markets such as Damascus. The Beirut–Damascus road crossed the mountain range and was served by caravanserais. Cities surrounding the range, including Tripoli, Beirut, Sidon, Damascus, and Acre, were important points of exchange between the mountain and the wider region.

== Etymology ==
The name Mount Lebanon traces back to the Semitic root LBN, meaning 'white' (Phoenician 𐤋𐤁𐤍, Hebrew לָבָן, Ugaritic LBN, all meaning 'white'), likely a reference to the snow-covered mountains. In Strabo's Geography, the mountain range is known as Libanus.

== History ==
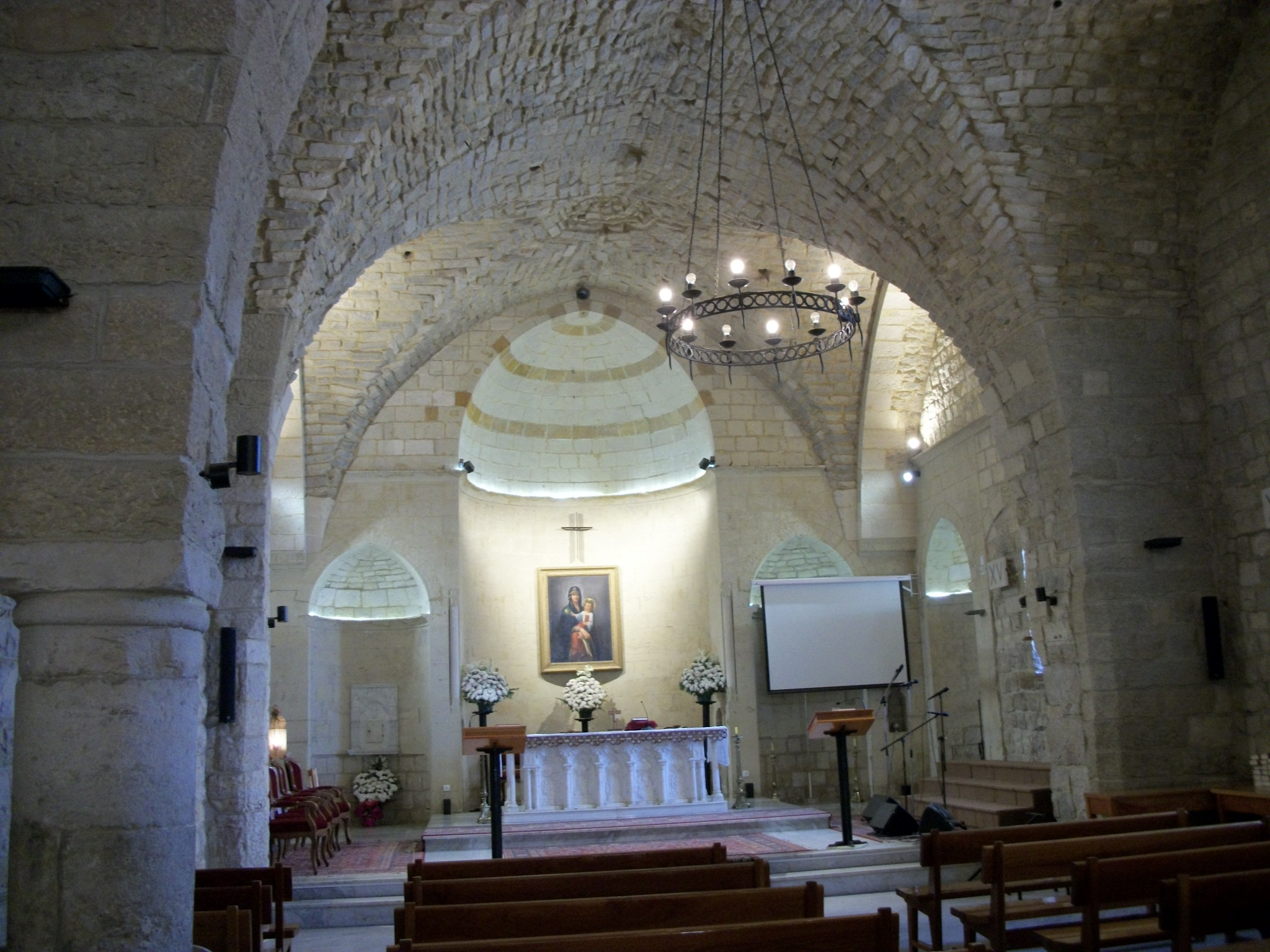
The Church of Saidet et Tallé in Deir al-Qamar, Lebanon.

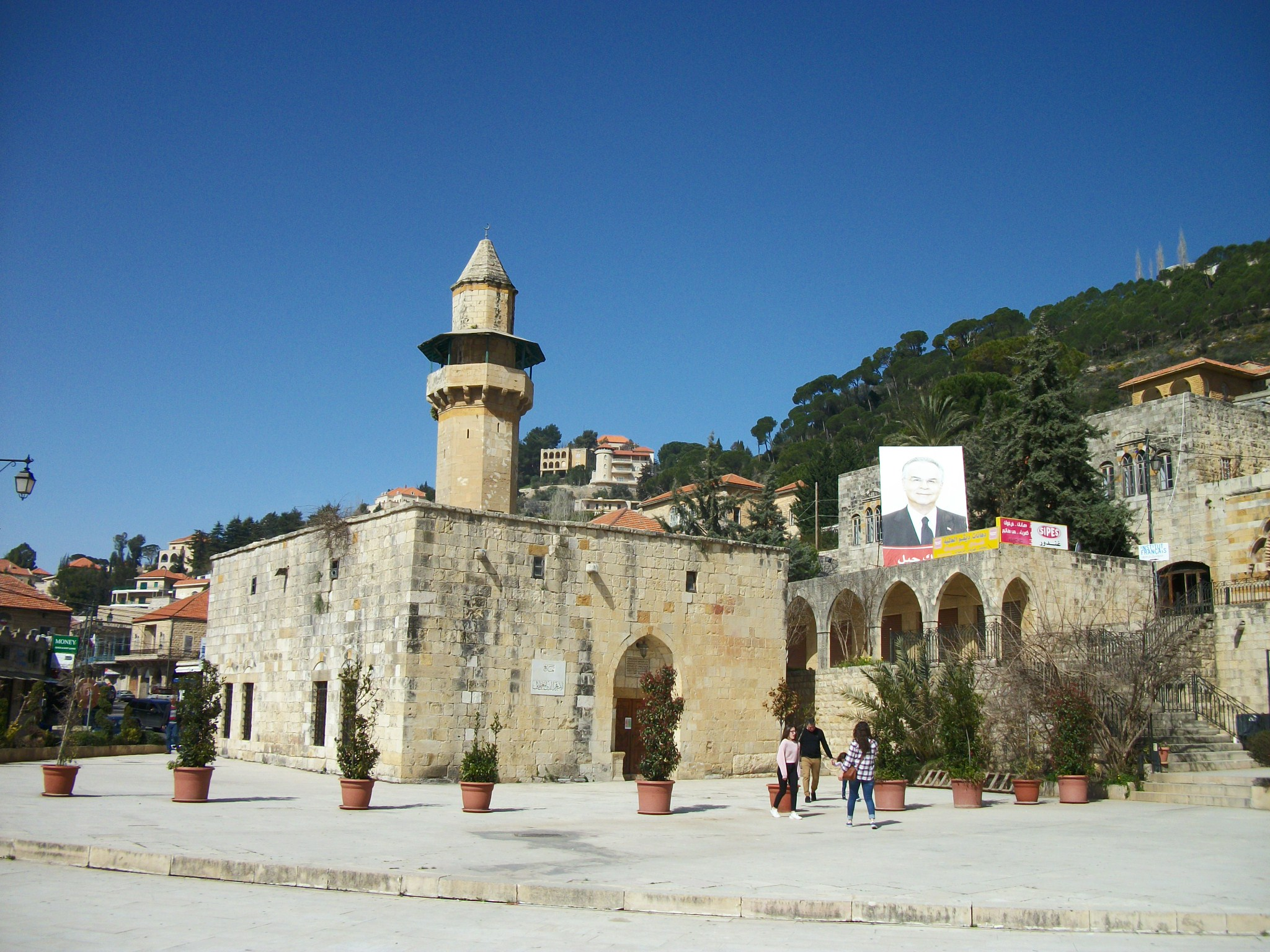
The Fakhreddine Mosque in Deir al-Qamar, built in 1493.

Mount Lebanon is mentioned in the Old Testament 103 times. King Hiram I of Tyre sent engineers with cedar wood, which was abundant on Mount Lebanon, to build Solomon's Temple in Jerusalem. Since then, the cedar species known scientifically as Cedrus libani is often associated with Mount Lebanon. The Phoenicians used cedar to build their ships which they sailed across the Mediterranean, they were the first to establish villages on Mount Lebanon and would live from cutting down cedars and sending them to the coast. After Pompey's conquest of the region in 64 BCE, Mount Lebanon was incorporated into the new Roman province of Syria (although Tacitus later mistakenly placed the range within Judaea).

Eusebius records that the Emperor Constantine destroyed a temple of Venus on the summit of Mount Lebanon. After the 5th century AD, Christian monks who were followers of a hermit named Maron, arrived from the Orontes River valley in Northern Syria and began preaching their religion to the inhabitants of the northernmost parts of the mountain range. In the late 8th century a group known as the Mardaites (also Jarajima) settled in North Lebanon following the order of the Byzantine Emperor; their mission was to raid Islamic territories in Syria. They merged with the local population, refusing to leave after the emperor struck a deal with the Muslim Caliph of Damascus; thus, they became part of the Maronite society. In 1291 after the fall of Acre, the last Crusader outpost in the Levant, remnants of the European settlers who succeeded in escaping capture by the Mamelukes settled in the Northern part of Lebanon and become part of the Maronite society.

Mount Lebanon has been visited and called home by many Muslim ascetics and Sufis since the 7th century, mentioned by many travelers to the region, few of which are known by name such as Shiban al-Muallah and Abbas al-Majnun. In the 10th century, Twelver Shia Muslim communities were likely established in Keserwan and the adjacent area to the north when Shia Islam was in the ascendant in Tripoli and the Islamic world at large. In the 13th century, a significant Shia population dominated Keserwan stretching out as far north as Dinniyeh, where reportedly the Shia feudal lord family, the Hamadas, were entrusted with tax-collection in 1470. Subject to harsh military campaigns and state policies put forth by the Mamluks and Ottomans over the centuries, this Shia population decreased over time and was driven to settle in Southern Lebanon and the Bekaa valley, becoming a small minority in Mount Lebanon by the 19th century.

In the 9th century, tribes from the "Jabal el Summaq" area north of Aleppo in Syria began settling the southern half of the mountain range. These tribes were known as the Tanoukhiyoun and in the 11th century they converted to the Druze faith and ruled the areas of Mount Lebanon stretching from Metn in the north to Jezzine in the south. This entire area became known as the 'Jabal ad-Duruz'. In the early 17th century, Emir Fakhr-al-Din II was entrusted as the main tax-collector and land-assigner in the Druze part of the mountains known as the Chouf. In an effort to re-populate the Chouf after the 1585 Ottoman expedition, Fakhreddine opened the door to Christians and in particular the Maronite settlement of the Chouf and Metn.

During the Ottoman era, the Qays–Yaman rivalry saw a resurgence in Mount Lebanon. The feud was mostly fought out between different Druze clans until the Battle of Ain Dara in 1711 led to the near complete exodus of Yamani Druze.

Within the Ottoman Empire, Mount Lebanon enjoyed relative autonomy. Nevertheless, ultimate authority lay with an Ottoman governor in neighboring vilayet (province) Sayda.

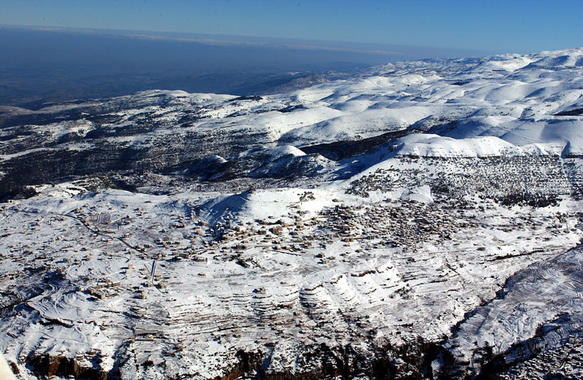
Snow on Mount Lebanon.

Starting in the 18th century, Maronite settlements expanded into druze controlled districts of Mount Lebanon, a demographic shift that strained the existing social order. Tensions further escalated after the peasant uprising of Kisrawan in 1858. The Druze won militarily, but not politically, because European powers (mainly France and Britain) intervened on behalf of the Maronites and divided Mount Lebanon into two areas; Druze and Maronite. Seeing their authority decline in Mount Lebanon, a few Lebanese Druze began migrating to the new Jabal ad-Duruz in southern Syria. In 1861, the "Mount Lebanon" autonomous district was established within the Ottoman system, under an international guarantee.

For centuries, the Maronites of the region have been protected by the noble Khazen family, which was endowed the responsibility by Pope Clement X and King Louis XIV and given Cheikh status in return for guarding the princes Fakhr-al-Din II and Younès al-Maani. The Khazen crest reflects the family's special closeness to Mount Lebanon, with snowy mountains and a cedar tree depicted.

During the Lebanese Civil War of 1983-84, Mount Lebanon became the site of the Mountain War. The sub-conflict resulted in a victory for the LNRF, causing factors of the Lebanese Armed Forces to withdraw from the southern summit.

== Intercommunal relationships ==
Bsharri, a Christian village in the Kadisha Valley on Mount Lebanon.

The Christian and Druze communities have a long history of interaction dating back roughly a millennium, particularly in Mount Lebanon. Over the centuries, they have peacefully interacted and lived together, sharing common social and cultural landscapes, although occasional exceptions have occurred. Historian Ussama Makdisi notes that members of the different religious communities generally respected one another's religious spheres and sometimes participated in each other's feasts, ceremonies, and customs. The interaction between the Christians and the Druzes has also been marked by shared economic activities, cultural exchange, and even political alliances in some cases. The two communities lived among each other and interacted socially on an everyday basis. The close bonds between Christian and Druze neighbors led to Christian communities thriving in some Druze towns.

According to some scholars, historically, Druze communities had better relationships with Christians than with Muslims. They also point out that Christians tended to show more tolerance towards the Druze community and their religion compared to Muslims. Traditionally, Druze settlements in the Levant often included Christian families and communities, while Muslim presence was rare.

== Political term ==
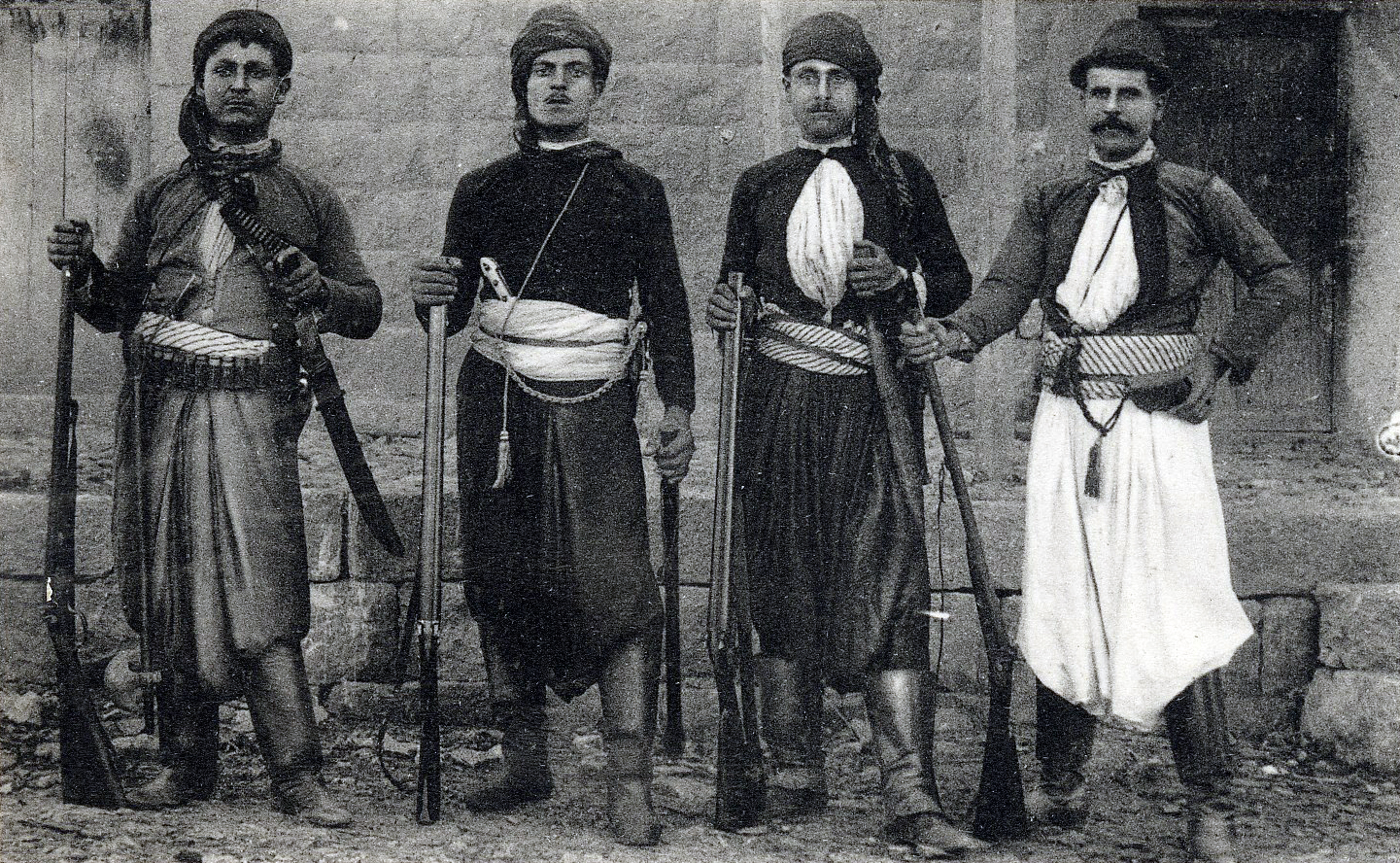
Armed men from Mount Lebanon, late 19th century

Historically, "Mount Lebanon" referred primarily to the mountain range rather than to a single political or administrative territory. Different parts of the range were also known by regional names: the southern section was commonly referred to as Jabal al-Druze or Jabal al-Shuf, while the northern section was sometimes called Jabal Kisrawan.

Mount Lebanon also lent its name to two political designations: a semi-autonomous province in Ottoman Syria that was established in 1861 and the central Governorate of modern Lebanon (see Mount Lebanon Governorate). The Mount Lebanon administrative region emerged in a time of the Rise of nationalism under the Ottoman Empire after the civil war of 1860. France intervened on behalf of the local Christian population and Britain on behalf of the Druze after the 1860 massacres in which 10,000 Christians were killed in clashes with the Druze. In 1861, the "Mount Lebanon" autonomous district was established within the Ottoman system, under an international guarantee. The Maronite Catholics and the Druze founded modern Lebanon in the early eighteenth century, through the ruling and social system known as the "Maronite-Druze dualism" in Mount Lebanon Mutasarrifate.

For decades, the Christians pressured the European powers to award them self determination by extending their small Lebanese territory to what they dubbed "Greater Lebanon", referring to a geographic unit comprising Mount Lebanon and its coast, and the Beqaa Valley to its east. After the First World War, France took hold of the formerly Ottoman holdings in the northern Levant, and expanded the borders of Mount Lebanon in 1920 to form Greater Lebanon, which was to be populated by remnants of the Middle Eastern Christian community. The Christians ended up gaining territorially, but the new borders merely ended the demographic dominance of Christians in the newly created territory of Lebanon.

== See also ==
- List of mountains in Lebanon
- Christianity in Lebanon
- Cedars of God Nature Reserve
- Horsh Ehden Nature Reserve
- Mount Lebanon Governorate
- French Mandate of Lebanon
- Subdivisions of the Ottoman Empire
