= Wadia Sabra =

Lebanese composer (1876–1952)

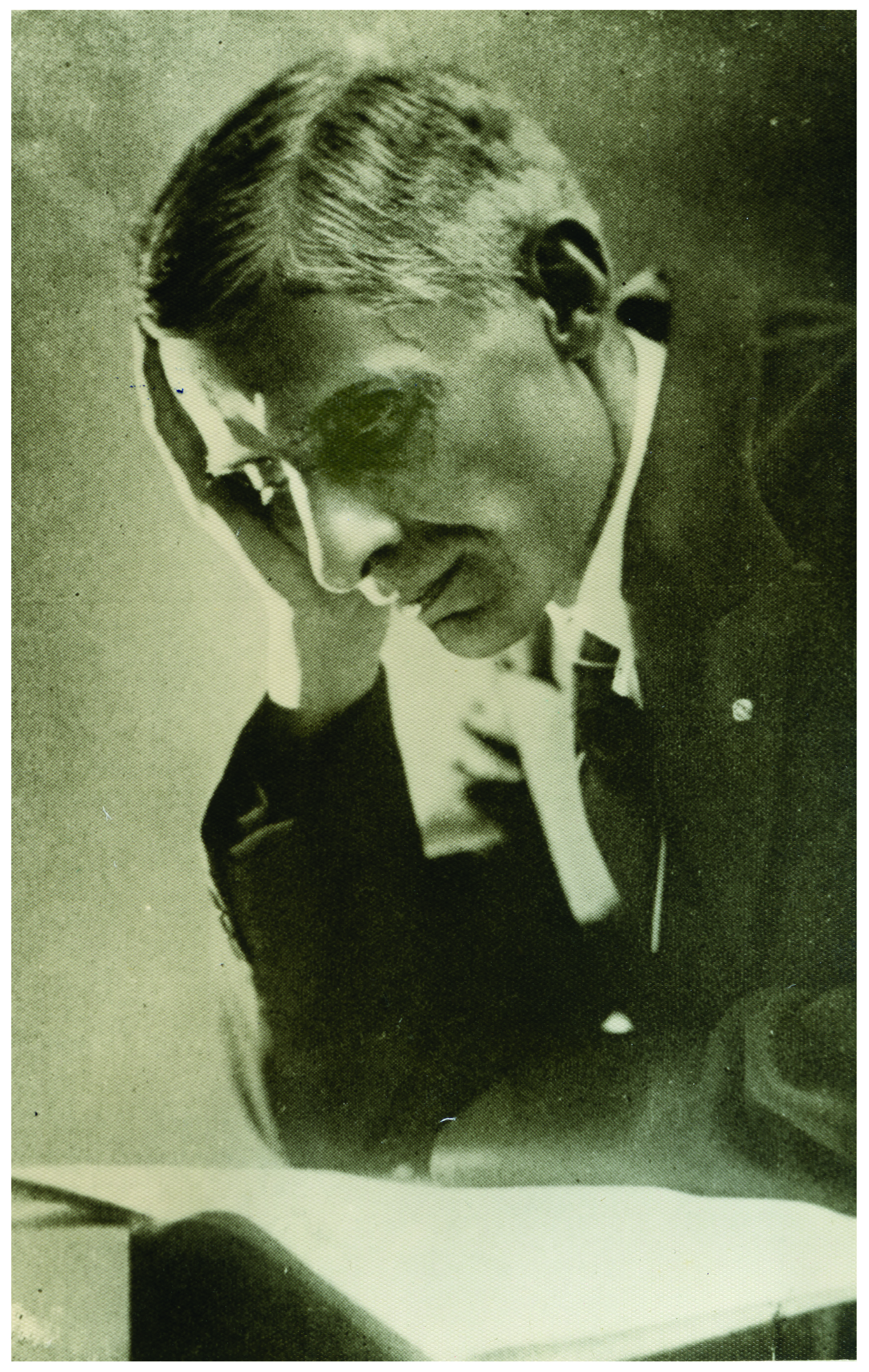
- Born: 23 February 1876; Ain El Jdideh, Mount Lebanon Mutasarrifate, Ottoman Empire
- Died: 11 April 1952 (aged 76); Beirut, Lebanon
- Burial place: Evangelical Cemetery, Sodeco, Beirut
- Education: American University of Beirut; Paris Conservatory, under Albert Lavignac
- Known for: First Lebanese to study at the Paris Conservatory, 1895; Composed the National Anthem of Lebanon, 1927; Founder of the Lebanese National Conservatory of Music, 1929
- Spouse: Adèle Misk (m. 1921)
- Children: Badia Achkar Haddad (adopted in 1950)

Wadia (or Wadih) (Note: He personally insisted on transcribing his name Wadia, with an a at the end, and all his printed works have that specific spelling.) Sabra (Arabic: وديع صبرا, romanized: Wadīʻ Ṣabrā; 23 February 1876 – 11 April 1952) was a Lebanese composer and the founder of the Conservatoire Libanais.

== Life ==
Wadia Sabra was born in 1876 in the village of Ain El Jdideh and died in Beirut in 1952. He married Adèle Misk in 1921 and had no children. He was buried in the Evangelical Cemetery in Sodeco, Beirut. He is considered the founding father of classical music in Lebanon.

As a composer, his music is characterized as a blend of Western and Eastern musical languages, incorporating the strengths and charms of both traditions. He is best known today as the composer of the Lebanese national anthem, popularly known as "Kulluna lil Watan" (words by Rashid Nakhle), which was officially adopted by the Lebanese Government through a presidential decree on 12 July 1927.

After studying at the American University of Beirut, he left for Paris in 1892, with a scholarship from the French Embassy to study at the Paris Conservatory. He stayed for 7 years where he studied with the musicologist Albert Lavignac. He took a job as the principal organist of the Evangelical Church of the Holy Spirit. He then returned to Beirut, where he founded, in 1910, the first School of Music (Dar ul Musica). Despite having a great interest in the study of Western disciplines, Sabra was, during his first stay in Paris, the initiator of a new style in oriental music, particularly Lebanese. His conspicuous taste for research made him return to Paris, where he worked with the Pleyel studios to develop a "new unit of measurement", the "universal range", which he was going to present to the specialists in music during a Congress planned in Beirut, had he not died on the 11th of April 1952.

Sabra, the founder-administrator of "Dar ul Musica" saw his School become "national" on 31 October 1925, which, in 1929, also grew to become the "National Conservatory", which he was called to direct. Not only does his legacy include a keyboard with quarter-tone intervals, but also work on "Arab music, basis of Western art", as well as a certain number of various works, including the Lebanese National Anthem. The National School of Music has been endowed with a Monthly Review, a permanent link between this Institution, its students, and the first music lovers of Lebanon.

Most of Sabra's music was considered lost, and only a few examples of his work remained in the performance repertoire; however, as of 2016, all his works have been found and archived at the Centre du patrimoine musical libanais (CMPL).

Sabra was "in ruins" after spending all his money on his work; hence, after many unsuccessful requests of grants and retirement pension to the Lebanese government, his wife, Adèle Misk, went to live with her nephew Dr. Robert Misk. Moreover, the atmosphere between Adèle and their adoptive daughter Badiha Ashkar had arrived to a point of no return, she decided to hide all her husband's works in a blue metal trunk box that the family called "La Malle Bleue", where they remained until 2016, when the Misk family gave it to the CPML for safekeeping.

Because of these archives, Zeina Saleh Kayali was able to write a biography on Wadia Sabra in 2018 in the collection "Figures musicales du Liban" (Musical Figures of Lebanon). (ISBN 978-2-7053-4002-5)

in 2021, the baritone Fady Jeanbart published 2 books of scores of Sabra's works:

1. Les Bergers de Canaan & L'Émigré (extraits) ISBN 978-9953-0-5443-8
2. 20 pièces pour piano ISBN 978-9953-0-5442-1

Sabra had an oriental piano manufactured by Pleyel in Paris in 1920.

On the initiative of the "Friend of the Cedars Forest Committee-Bsharry" as well as baritone Fady Jeanbart, a cedar was baptized in the name of Wadia Sabra in the new reserve of the Cedars of God forest in northern Lebanon on Sunday October 2, 2022. It bears the number: Z10-2066/6477.

== Selected works ==
=== Operas ===
- Les Bergers de Canaan, (The Shepards of Canaan) biblique opera in Turkish, libretto by Halide Edib Hanoum, 1917, French version by Mrs J.Ph de Barjeau
- Les Deux Rois, (The Two Kings) 1st opera in Arabic, libretto by father Maroun Ghosn, 1928
- L'Émigré, (The Emigrant) French operetta, libretto by Robert Chamboulan, 1931

=== Oratorio ===
- Les Voix de Noël, Oratorio pour solistes (Baryton, Mezzo, ténor et choeur), paroles d'Auguste Fisch 1896
- Nous prêchons ton amour, cantique religieux pour solo (Mezzo ou Baryton) et choeur, 1896
- Venez à moi, cantique religieux pour solo (Mezzo ou Baryton)et choeur, 1896
- La gloire du Liban, cantique pour solo et choeur, paroles du père Maroun Ghosn (1880–1940)

=== Melodies ===
- Quoi? tout est fini?, Arabic lyrics by Saïd Akl
- Souvenir d'une mère, Arabic lyrics by Shibli Mallat (1876–1961)
- Notre mère la Terre, Arabic lyrics by Rushdi Ma'louf (1915–1980)
- Me voilà Liban, pour soliste et choeur, Arabic lyrics.
- Voici le matin, Arabic lyrics by Gibran Khalil Gibran.
- Le desert, pour soliste et choeur, Arabic lyrics
- Ya Misrou, Chant Patriotique en l'honneur du héros national Saad Zaghloul Pacha, Arabic lyrics by d'Alexandra d'Avierino
- L'Hymne de la Gaule, French lyrics by E.Creissel

=== Piano ===
- Valse de Concert (1906)
- Valse Caprice (1933)
- Valse Orientale
- La Rozana, 12 variations sur l'air populaire (1913)
- El Dabké, le véritable quadrille orientale
- Gavotte en ré mineur
- Hawed min hona, 12 variations (1924)
- Several untitled pieces, essentially dances & marches
- Recueil d'airs Orientaux : (1906-1909)
1. Ahwal - Ghazal
2. Ouaskinir - Rah
3. Kaddoulal - Mayyass
4. Raieh - feine
5. Antal - Moumannah
6. Marche Orientale
7. Kom Ouastameh
8. Ya Ghazâli
9. Padishahem
10. Al Djazayer
11. Polka Orientale
12. Ya Safal - Azman
13. Binteche - Chalabyya
14. Oumi Tkaddari
15. Tafta Hindi
16. Madad Madad
17. La Constitutionnelle
18. Hymne Constitutionnel
19. 2e Marche Orientale
20. 3e Marche Orientale

== Decorations ==
France
- Officer of the Order of Academic Palms
- Medal of Officer of the Order of Public Instruction
- Knight of the Legion of Honor

Lebanon
- Silver Merit Medal: 22 May 1935 (decree no. 1853)
- Gold Merit Medal: 12 April 1952 (decree no. 299, posthumous)
