= Amin Nakhla =

Lebanese writer

Amin Nakhle
- أمين نخلة
- Born: 25 July 1901; Majdal Maouche
- Died: 13 May 1976 (aged 74); Beirut
- Resting place: Barouk
- Education: Saint Joseph University
- Occupations: journalist, poet, politician

Amin Nakhle (Arabic: أمين نخلة; 25 July 1901 – 13 May 1976) was a Lebanese lawyer, editor, poet and writer.

== Early life and career ==
Amin Nakhle was born in the town of Majdal Maouche, in the Chouf district on 25 July 1901. He is the son of Rashid Nakhle who wrote the Lebanese national anthem. Amin Nakhla was schooled in Deir al-Qamar. He completed his studies at the University of Damascus (Faculty of Law) and at the French College of Beirut. A graduate in administrative law, he practiced as a lawyer and journalist from 1928 and as a journalist. He was a newspaper owner and editor. In 1947, Nakhla became the MP for Mount Lebanon.

He was a member of the Arab Academy from 1967.

He obtained a job in the office of the French Governor-General, but he rejected it in favor of the law firm.

== Works ==
=== Poetry ===
Amin Nakhla's poetry is characterized by tenderness and well recognized in literary and poetic circles. Recognition increased with time due to his relations with the great poets of his time in Egypt, Lebanon, Syria and Iraq.

Nature has inspired him with a lot of poetry and prose, and devoted a book entitled 'Le Journal de la campagne' or "The Rural Notebook", which was characterized by the beauty of his style and elegance, in which he regains a daily image abounds in the countryside simply and spontaneously.

=== Awards ===
In 1965, he won the President of the Lebanese Republic Award for Best Book of the Year.

=== Other works ===
Amin Nakhla wrote one book in 1942 called Al-Mufakkira al-Rifiyya, that talked about the innocence that presided over the people that live in the countryside as opposed to the people that lived in the city. Once the book was released it was viewed as a discursive event in the Arabic world. In the book he encourages rural life because he believed that the city life was always about gaining more. When he published some chapters of his Mufakkira in the press he chose a pseudonym, Fuad Effendi, since he believed that an author should show himself through his works not necessarily by his name.

== Amin's perspective on the Quran ==
Amin Nakhla consistently expressed profound admiration for the eloquence of the Quran in his writings. He even went so far as to characterize it as truly miraculous, emphasizing:

"Whenever I read the Quran and find myself captivated by its eloquence from all sides, as I witness the miraculous phenomenon that overwhelms the mind, I then exclaim to myself: Woe to you, Save yourself, for you are of the Christian faith!"

== Personal life ==
His father was Rashid Nakhla, a Lebanese poet, writer and journalist. He had a sister named Marcel, the wife of George Faya.

Among his works are his novel Muhsin al-Hazzan and a popular poetry collection.

== Death ==
Towards the end of his life, Amin Nakhla worked on his memories. He suffered a brain hemorrhage that led to memory loss. He died without or memorial service on 13 May 1976 in Beirut at the age of 75. He was buried in his ancestral village of Barouk, Lebanon.
