= Ain El Jdideh =

Village in Aley District, Beirut

Ain el jdide عين الجديدة
- Village
- Location in Lebanon
- Coordinates: 33.808245492520335°N 35.630822665463405°E
- Country: Lebanon
- Governate: Mount Lebanon
- District: Aley

Area
  - Total: 1.33 km^{2} (0.51 sq mi)
- Elevation: 930 m (3,050 ft)
- Time zone: UTC+2 (EET)
  - Summer (DST): +3

Ain El Jdideh (Lebanese Arabic: عين الجديدة, romanized: ʿAyn il-Jdīde) is a village located at a distance of about 19 kilometers (11.8 miles) from Beirut, in the governorate of mount Lebanon, in the Aley district. Ain El Jdideh municipality covers an area of 133 hectares (0.51338 sq mi). The village has an altitude of 930 meters (3051.18 feet) above sea level. It is the birthplace of composer Wadia Sabra.
