= Al Shouf Cedar Nature Reserve =

Nature reserve in Lebanon

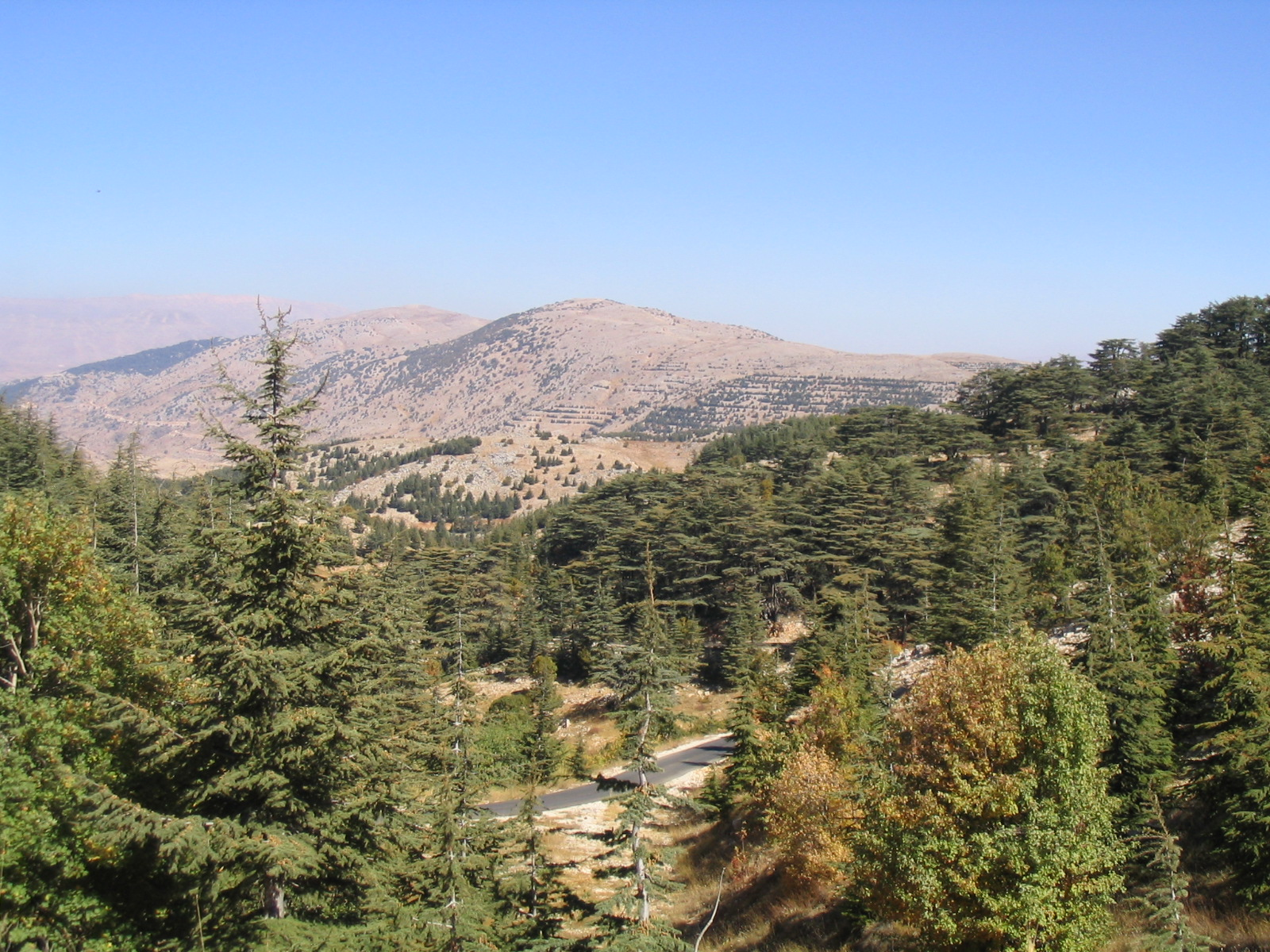
- Al Shouf Cedar Nature Reserve

- Location within Lebanon
- Location: Chouf District, Lebanon
- Coordinates: 33°41′39.25″N 35°42′07.63″E
- Area: 550 km^{2} (210 sq mi)
- Established: 1996
- Website: www.shoufcedar.org

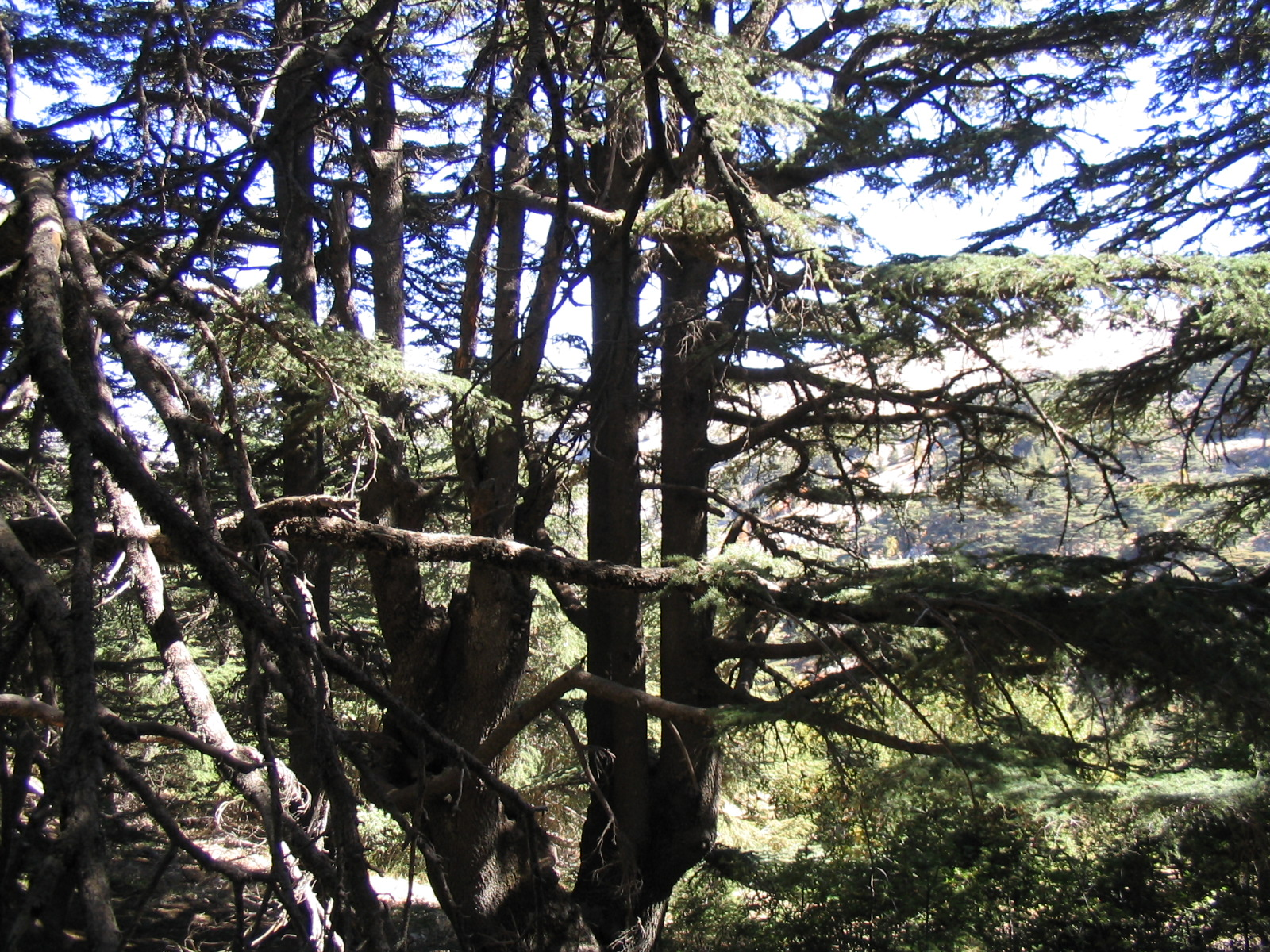
Inside the Barouk forest

Al Shouf Cedar Nature Reserve is a nature reserve in the Chouf and Aley districts of Lebanon. It is located on the slopes of Jebel Baruk mountain and has an area of 550 km^{2} (210 sq mi), nearly 5.3% of the Lebanese territory, making it the largest natural reserve in Lebanon.

The reserve contains the Lebanon cedar forests of Barouk, Maaser el Shouf and Ain Zhalta-Bmohray. It is an Important Bird Area (IBA) and Eco-tourism area. It hosts 32 species of wild mammals, 200 species of birds, and 500 species of plants.

== Geodiversity ==
The Barouk mountain comprises rocks from the Pliocene which have undergone major tectonic movement that divided the mountains of Lebanon into two parallel parts; the eastern range is called the Anti-Lebanon, and the western range is called Mount Lebanon. The two mountain ranges are separated by the Beqaa Valley, which is composed of recent infill sediments. The main rocks are limestone. The whole of the Barouk Mountain is cavernous limestone, with many surface features such as dolines indicating the underlying cavernous forms of the mountain range. One particularly noteworthy cave, estimated to be 700 metres (2,300 ft) long, is located near Niha village. The highest peak on the range at 1,980 metres (6,500 ft).

=== Hydrology ===
Precipitation in the watershed is the source of both surface streamflow and groundwater. The major portion of this occurs as rain. Snowfall often occurs at the upper elevations but snow seldom persists more than a few days and disappears before the end of the rainy season. Normally snow has little overall direct effect on stream-flow within the watershed. A large proportion of the exposed surface rock in the Barouk region is cavernous, fissured and broken limestone, and its porous condition makes it very permeable. This results in much of the precipitation infiltrating with minimum surface runoff despite the often-shallow soils and sparse vegetative cover. Water percolates downward through the various formations and feeds the springs found on lower slopes in the area. Surface water flows originating on the range are mostly seasonal but some are perennial. Underground water generates outflow rivers such as:- Al Awali River, more commonly known as Al-Barouk river- Damour River, known as Al-Safa river. The summit of the range is considered as a divide between two hydrological systems because of the difference between the two slopes of the mountain. The rivers that flow in the valleys are the major source of agriculture irrigation and supply a dozen Shouf villages with domestic water and some of the western Bekaa villages.

=== Pedology ===
- Homogenous, belonging to the red brown Mediterranean soils formed on hard marl limestone.
- derived from Jurassic, Balthonian, Callovian to Oxfordien - Portlandian marl limestone.
- Stone contents ranges from 80 - 90%.

=== Climatology ===
The annual rainfall average is 1,200 mm (47 in), and the mean annual temperature is 11.3 °C (52.3 °F). The mean daily maximum temperature is 23.4 °C (74.1 °F) in August whereas the mean minimum temperature in January is −0.6 °C (30.9 °F). The absolute temperature ranges from −10.8 °C (12.6 °F) in January to 32.3 °C (90.1 °F) in August. The mean relative humidity lies around 65% but the eastern slopes are slightly drier. There are about 50 to 55 days of snow fall per year.

== Ecological significance ==
- Carbon sink: The forests in the reserve play a crucial role in balancing carbon dioxide concentrations in the atmosphere.
- Soil conservation: The forests help stabilize and protect soils on steep slopes.
- Agricultural Terraces: These structures prevent soil erosion and promote wildlife diversity.

== Biodiversity ==
=== Flora ===
The flora of the Al-Shouf Cedar area is partly covered by Mouterde's 1966, 1970 and 1983 flora of Lebanon. The most recent and extensive botanical researches on the official site were conducted, on behalf of the Ministry of Environment (Protected Areas Project), by (Georges Tohmé) the National Council for Scientific Research (NCSR) in 1999. Since then extremely few flora reports on the official site were published or known. Tohmé continued his field botanical studies at Al-Shouf Cedar Reserve during the last three years in order to obtain confirmation on the status of certain species. His recent new findings are published in Tohmé, G. & Tohmé, H. (2002). Few of them are incorporated here and the others will be added to the final report of the present study-project. The list of Al-Shouf Cedar Reserve species includes 500 identified species distributed over 61 families. Also the reserve is habitat to 25 internationally and nationally threatened species, 48 endemic to Lebanon or Lebanon and Syria or Lebanon and Turkey, and 14 rare species, whilst 214 species are restricted to the Eastern Mediterranean or Middle East area.

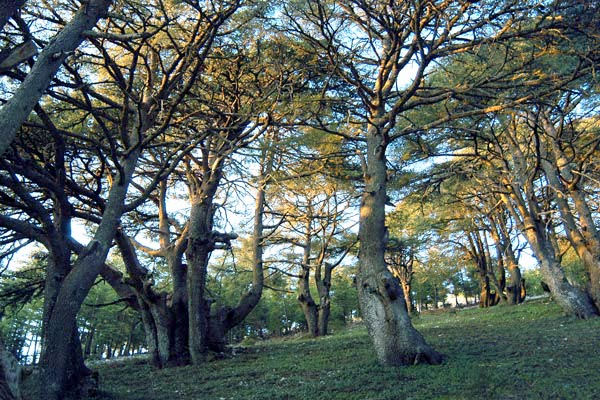
Cedar forest inside the reserve

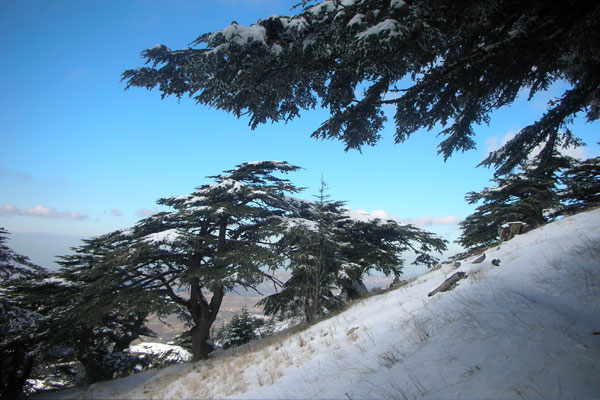
Cedars in winter

The reserve is also home to 24 tree species, of which some are found in Europe and the Mediterranean area as well as in Lebanon. The reserve is known for its official's efforts to save the cedar of Lebanon through continuous management of the forests and planting new trees in previously logged and deforestated areas. The reserve form the last natural limits to the spread of Cedrus libani on the planet. The reserve is also known for the ability of the forests to regenerate by their own without any human interference. Other tree species in the reserve include : Cyprus oak (Quercus infectoria ), Brant’s oak (Quercus brantii), kermes oak (Quercus calliprinos), Calabrian pine (Pinus brutia), Aleppo pine (Pinus halepensis), stone pine (Pinus pinea), Greek juniper (Juniperus excelca), Syrian juniper (Arceuthos drupacea).

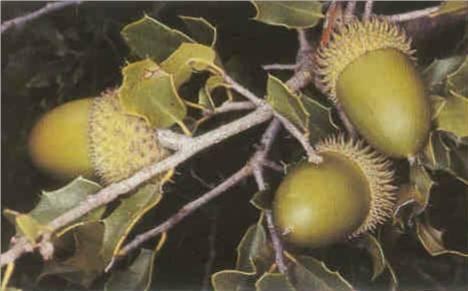
Kermes oak

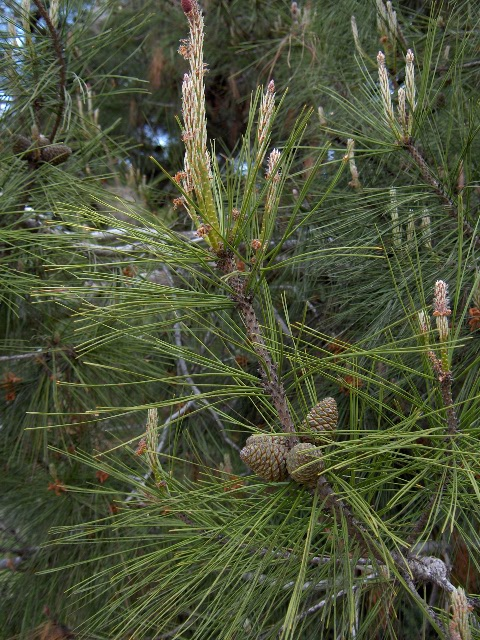
Calabrian pine

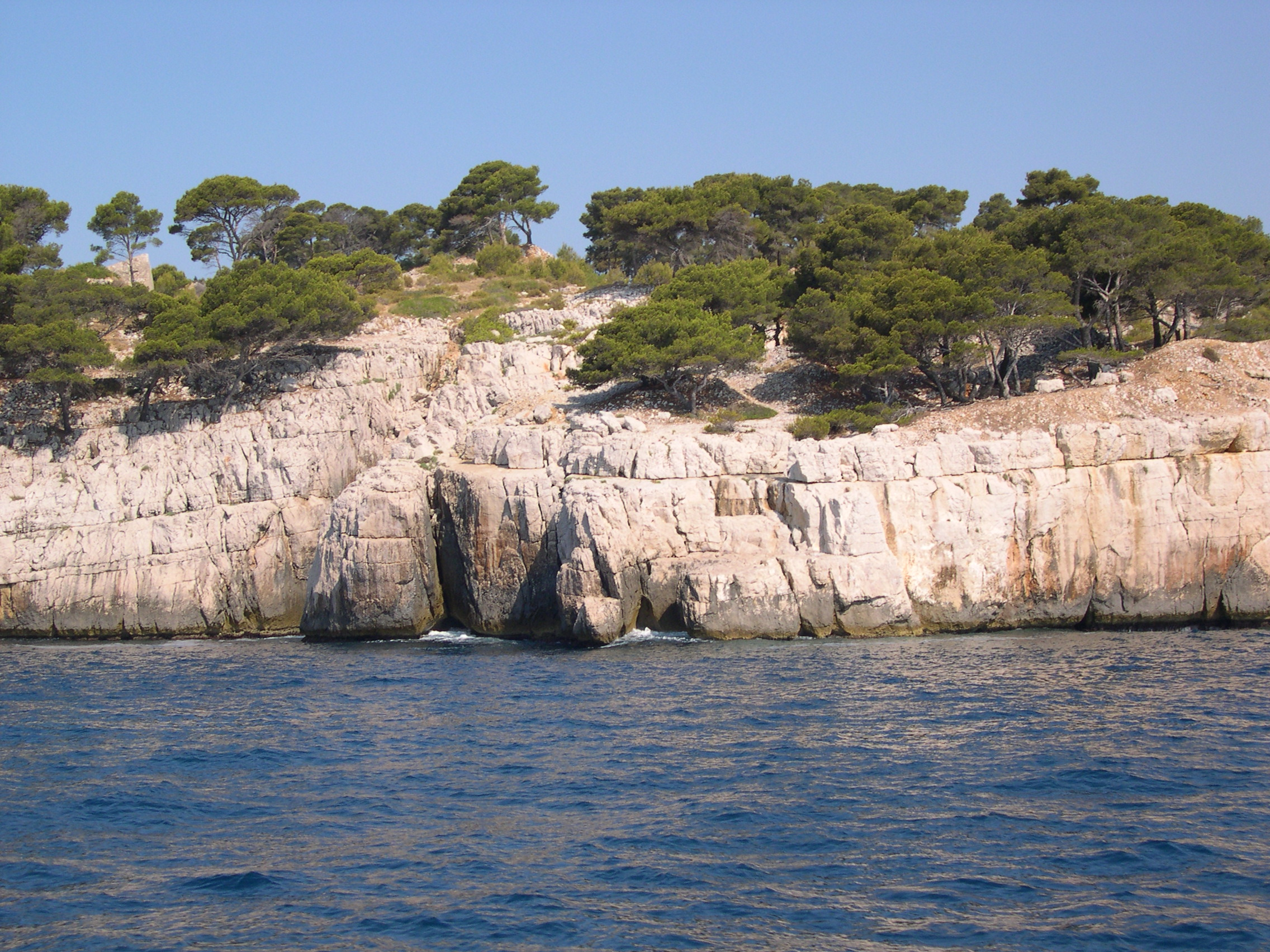
Aleppo pine (picture from France)

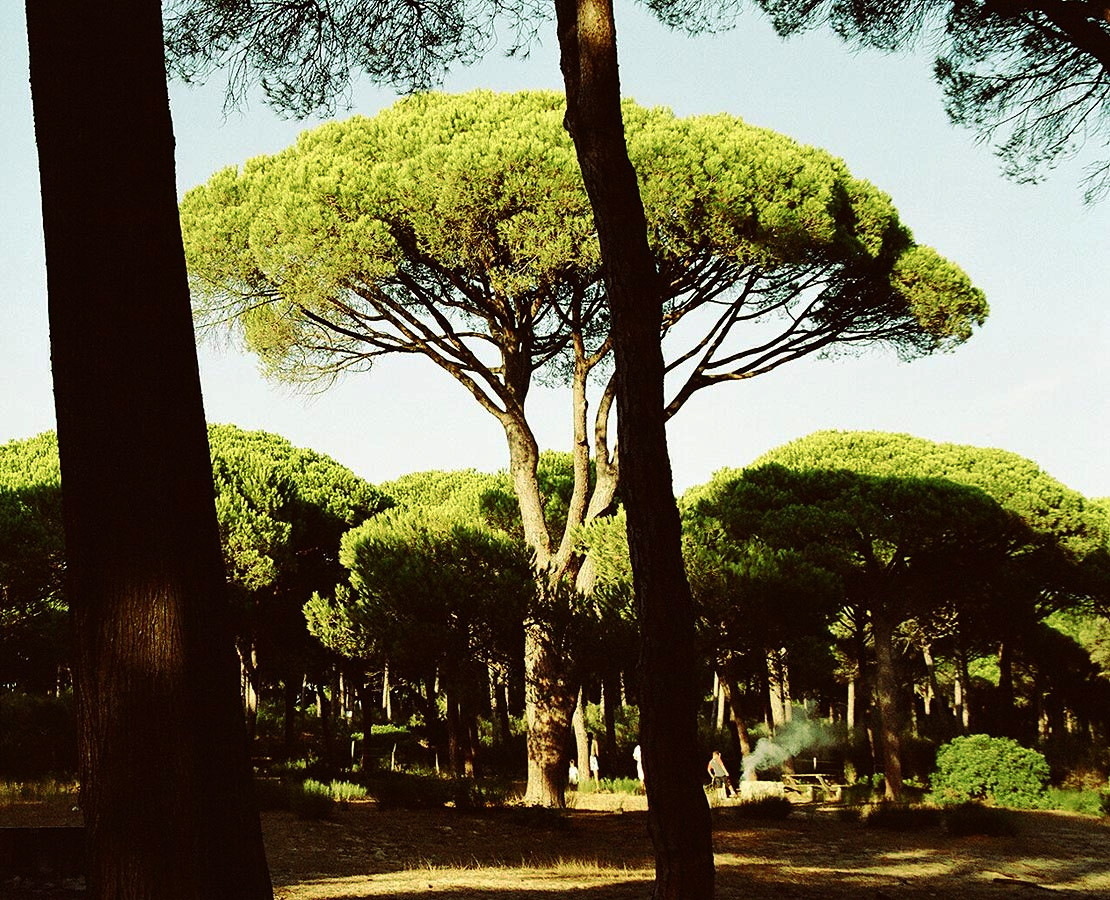
Stone pine

=== Fauna ===
==== Mammals ====
Mammal explorations in Lebanon were limited until around the middle of the twentieth century. They are fragmentary and provided little information on the mammals inhabiting the country. Many species and subspecies were not yet recorded for Lebanon till the 1970s. Between 1980 and 1985, Tohmé, G. and Tohmé, H. alone produced 33% of the known published papers on the Lebanese mammals. The only documented data of the mammals of Al-Shouf Cedar Reserve apparently appeared in the report of Tohmé, H. that was prepared, on behalf of the Protected Areas Project at the Ministry of Environment, in 1999 by the NCSR. This report, which was based on inventory and surveys as well as brochures and other documents developed by the managing team of the reserve, produced a list of 32 mammals which include: wild boar (Sus scrofa), gray wolf (Canis lupus ), beech marten (Martes foina), mountain gazelle (Gazella gazella), golden jackal (Canis aureus), red fox (Vulpes vulpes), European badger (Meles meles), Cape hare (Lepus capensis), Caucasian squirrel (Sciurus anomalus), roe deer (Capreolus capreolus), Persian fallow deer (Dama dama mesopotamica), wild goat (Capra aegagrus), Syrian brown bear (Ursus arctos syriacus), Middle East blind mole-rat (Nannospalax ehrenbergi) Indian porcupine (Hystrix indica), striped hyena (Hyaena hyaena), wild cat (Felis silvestris), Cape hyrax (Procavia capensis). The reserve launched a project to reintroduce the Nubian ibex (Capra nubiana) to the area from Jordan, after it was extinct in the mid-twentieth century.

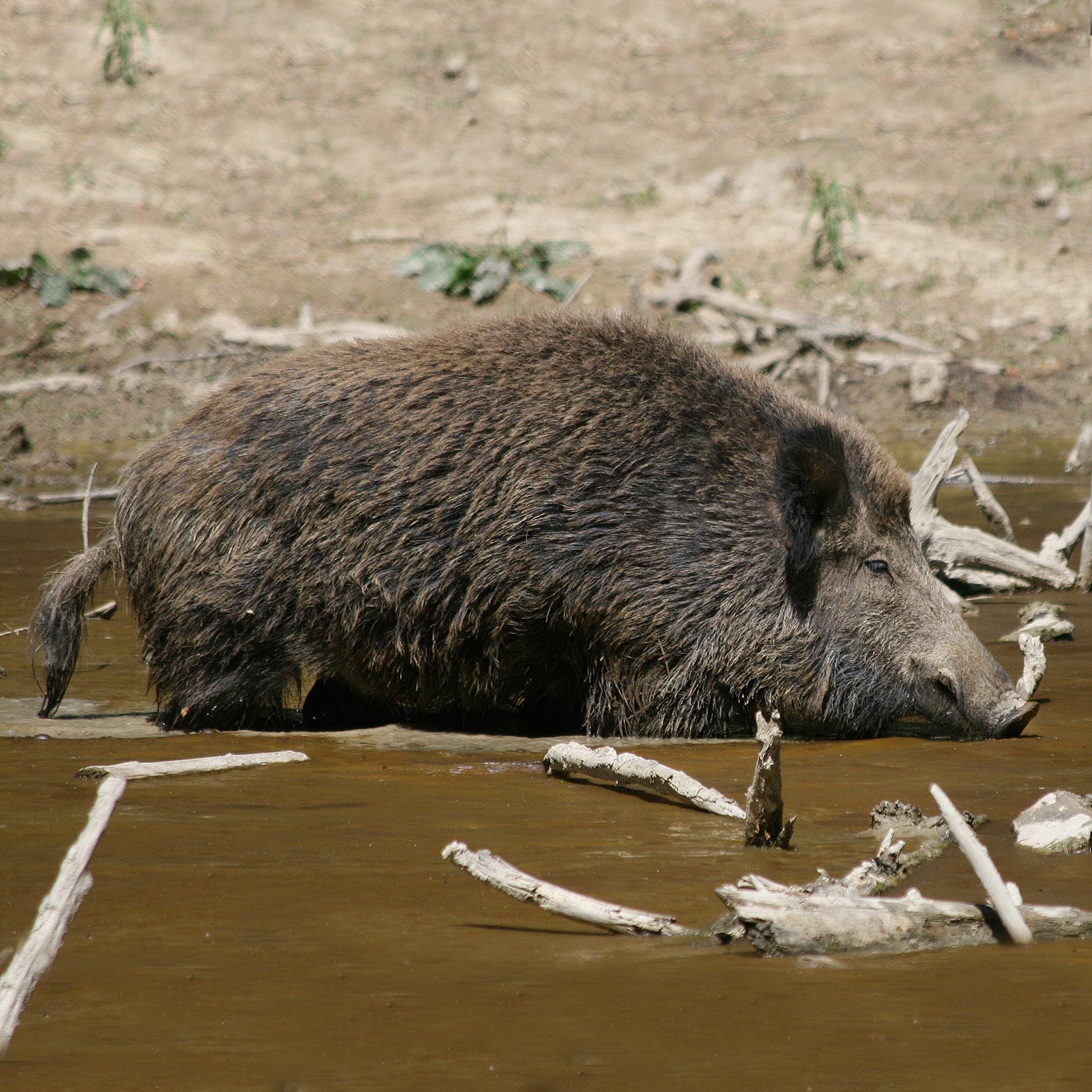
Wild boar

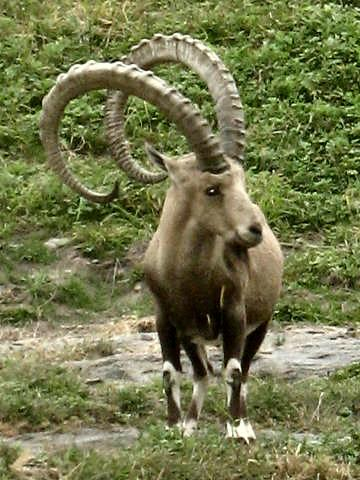
Nubian ibex

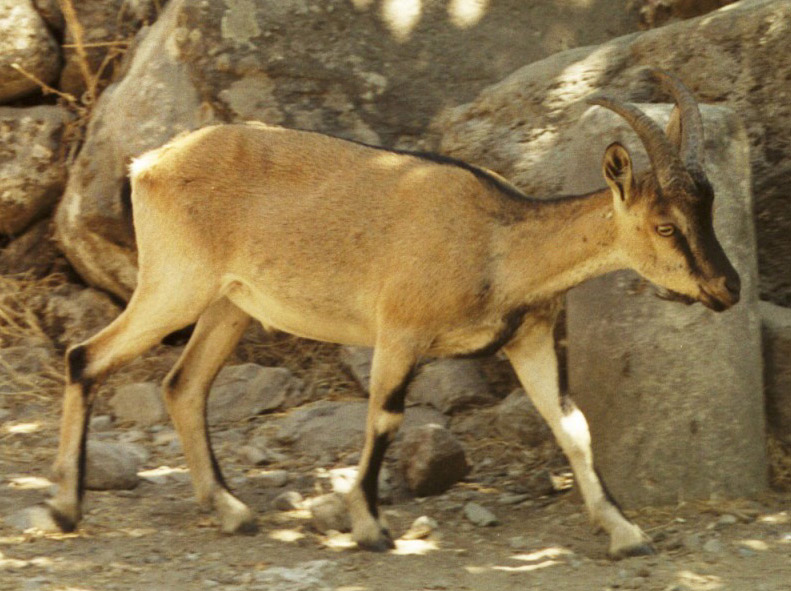
Wild goat

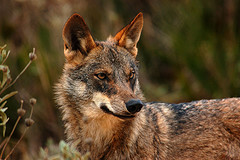
Gray wolf

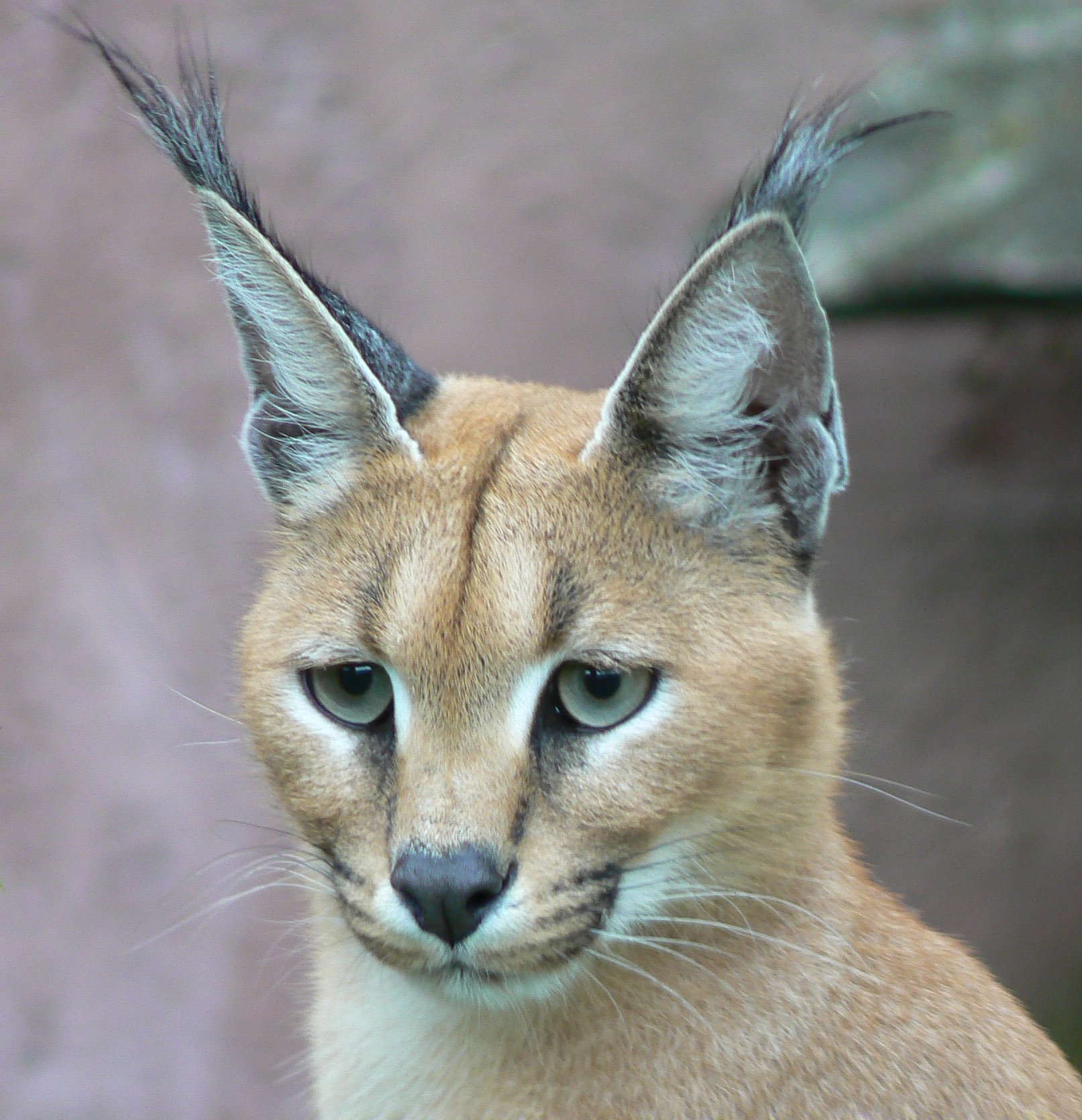
Caracal

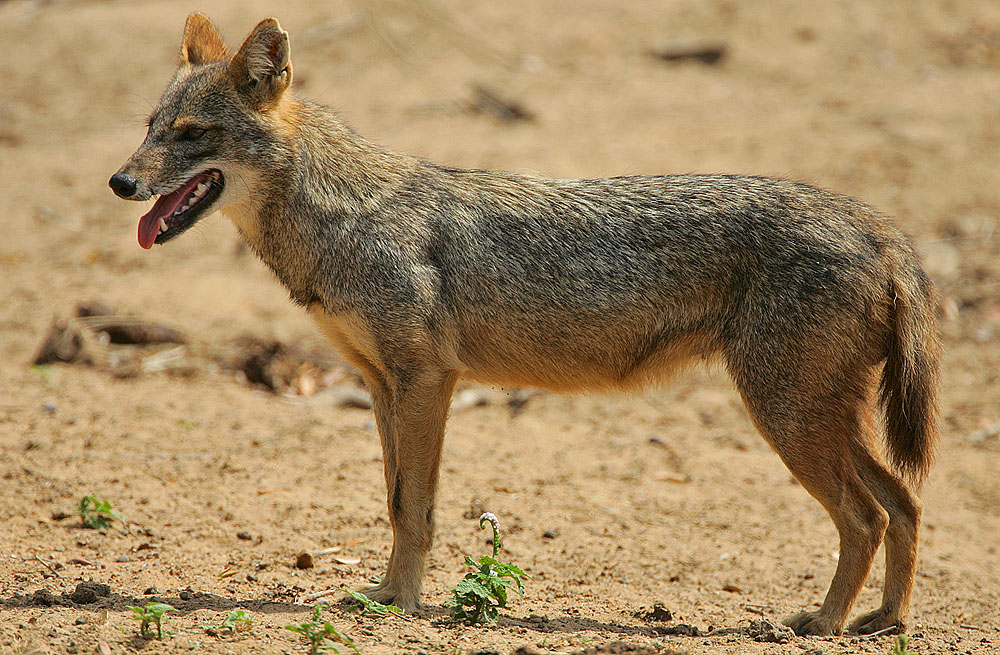
Golden jackal

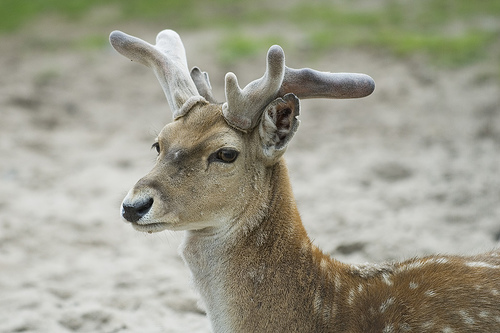
Persian fallow deer

==== Birds ====
The reserve is home to 200 species of birds, of which 19 are considered rare at the national level. More than 22 species have been confirmed to be resident, the rest are migratory or rare visitors, and at least two or three species have been introduced. The reserve holds a combination of birds found in Europe, Africa, and Asia which include: chukar (Alectoris chukar), Eurasian jay (Garrulus glandarius), blackbird (Turdus merula), common raven (Corvus corax), common kestrel (Falco tinnunculus), shore lark (Eremophila alpestris), common redstart (Phoenicurus phoenicurus), common chaffinch, (Fringilla coelebs), turtle dove (Streptopelia turtur), rock sparrow (Petronia petronia), European goldfinch (Carduelis carduelis).

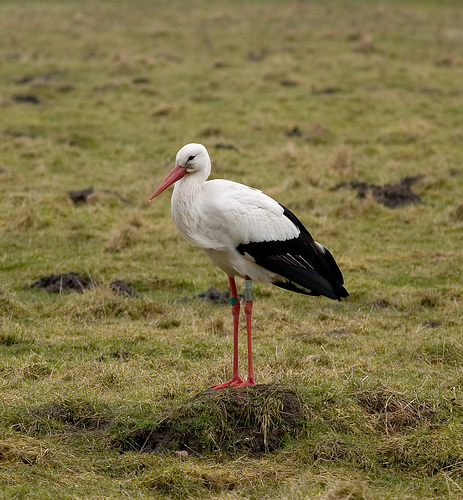
White stork

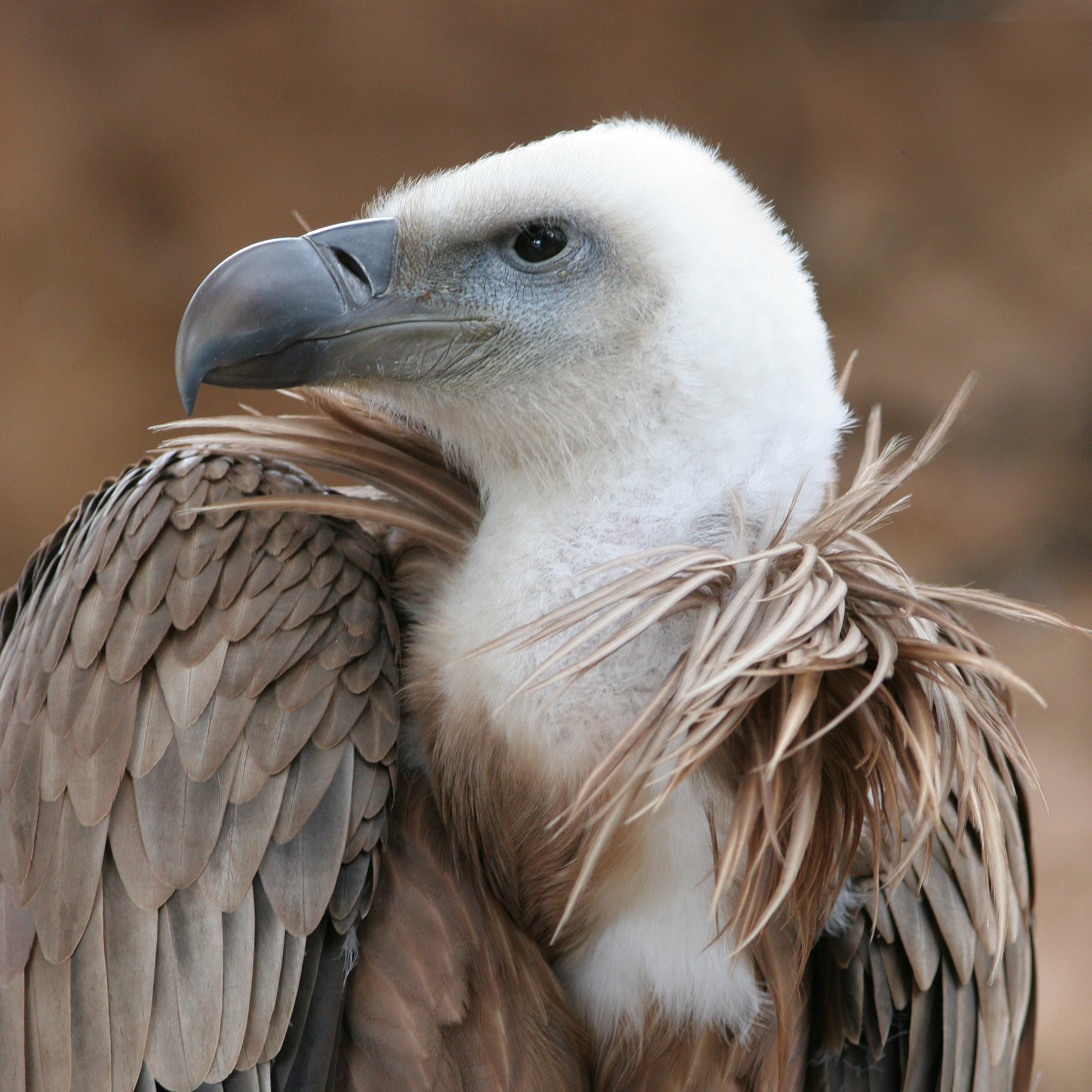
Griffon vulture

Two species at least have been introduced to the shouf area for hunting and expanded their range into the reserve, the two species are: rock partridge (Alectoris graeca), and common pheasant (Phasianus colchicus). The reserve is also home to many species of birds of prey such as: griffon vulture (Gyps fulvus), and the golden eagle (Aquila chrysaetos).

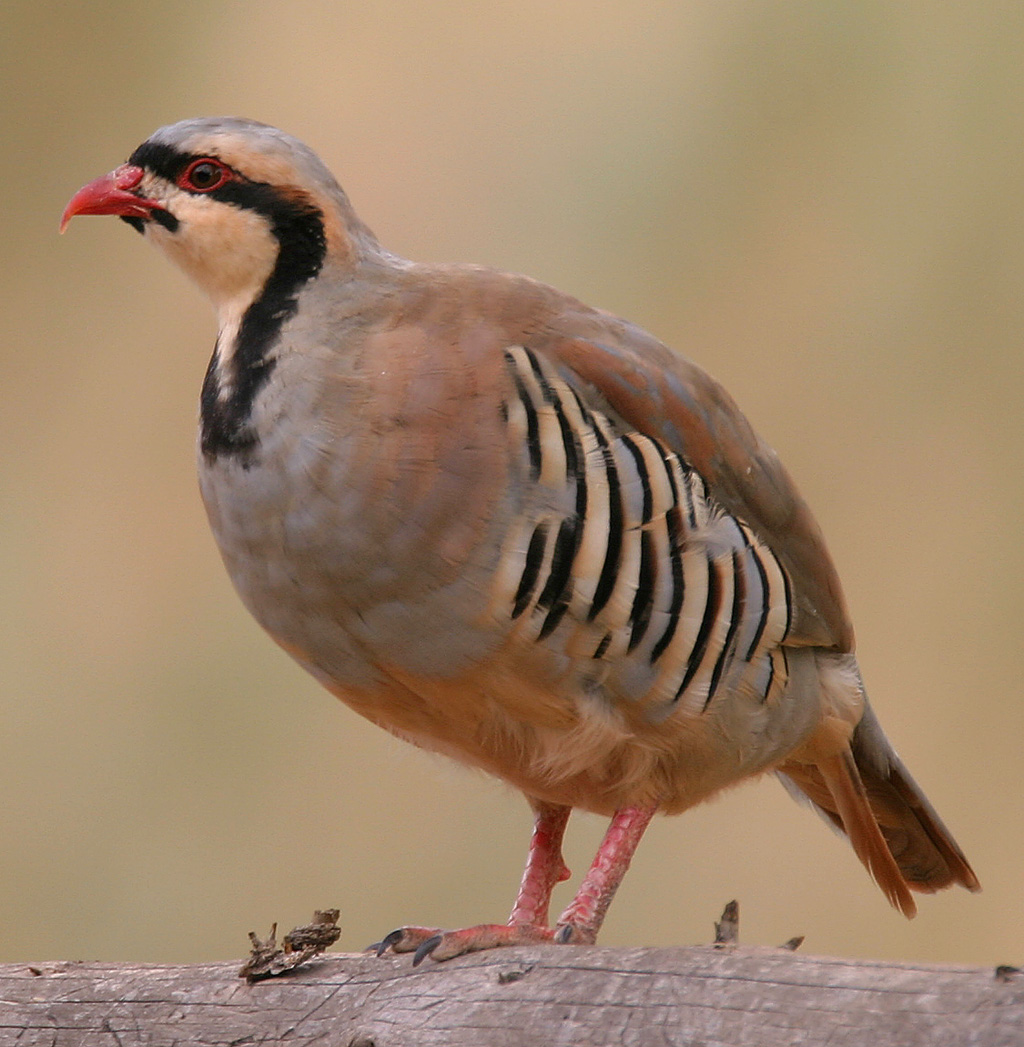
Chukar

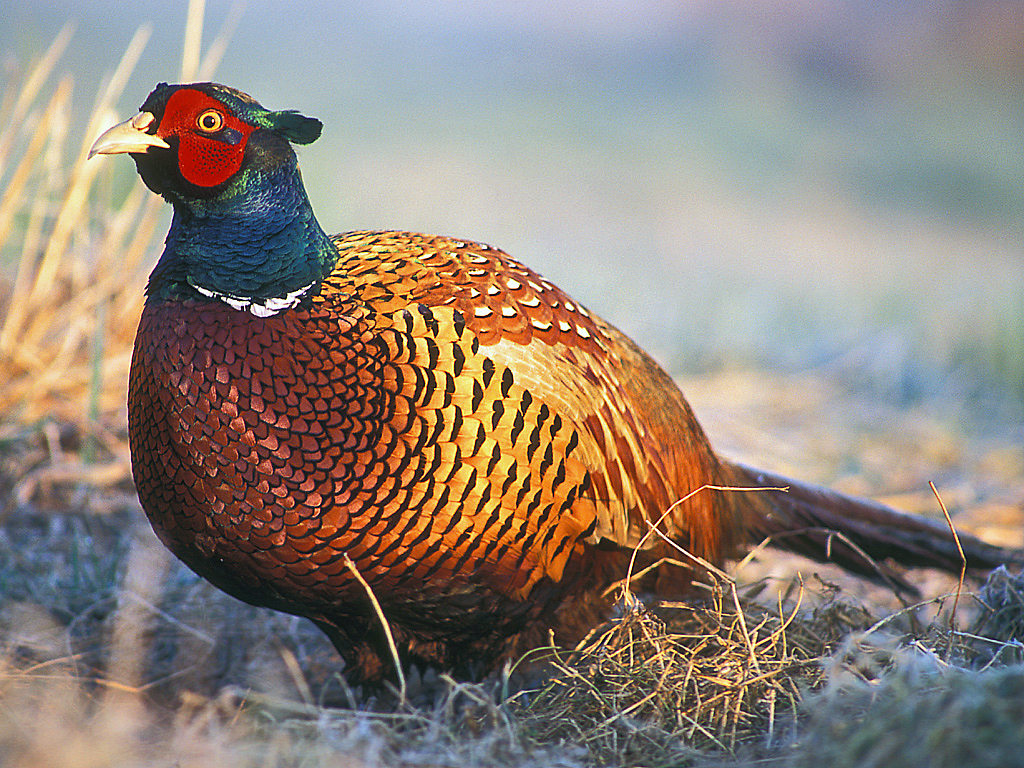
Common pheasant (male)

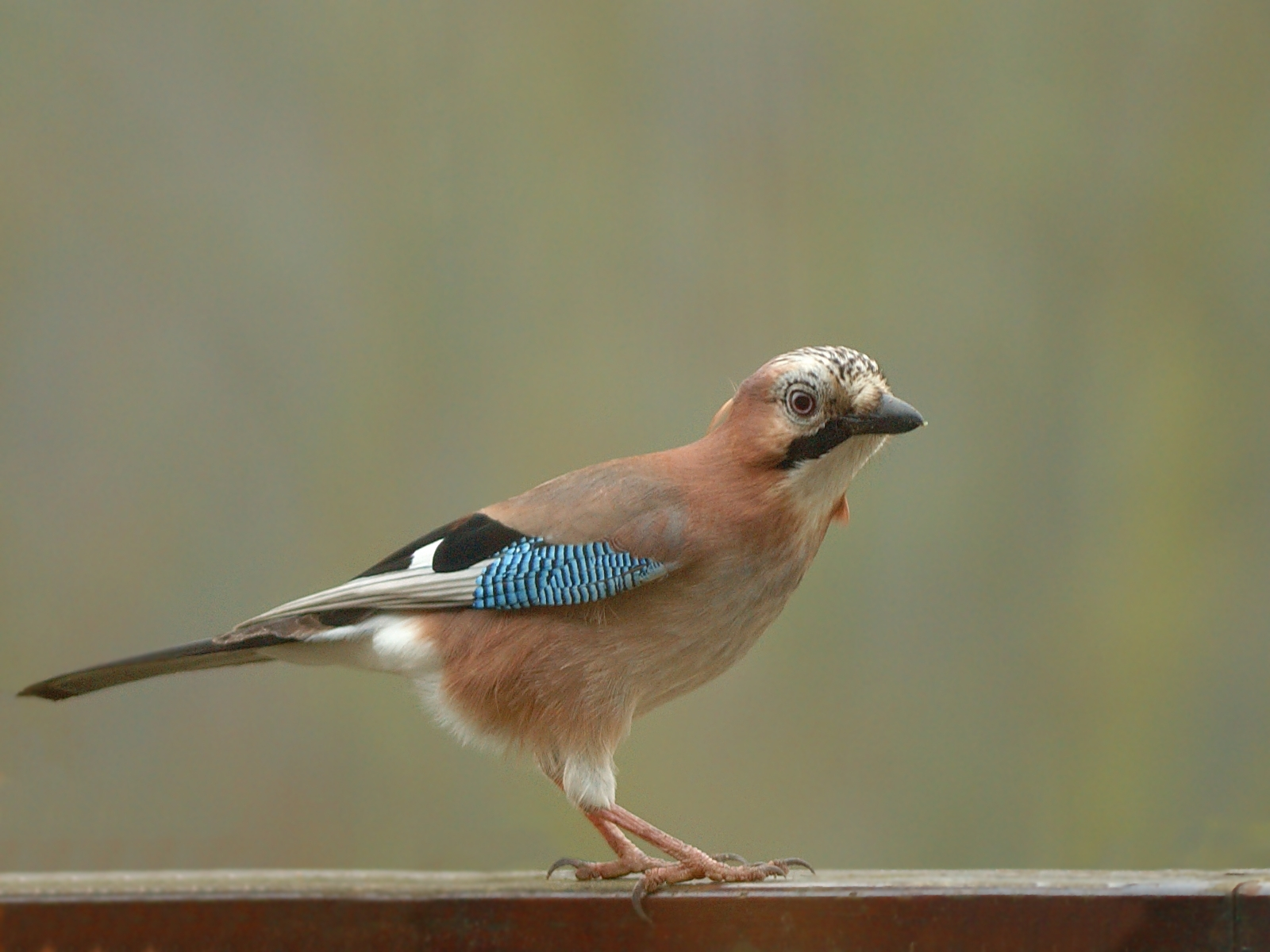
Eurasian jay (but not ssp. atricapillus, which occurs in Lebanon)

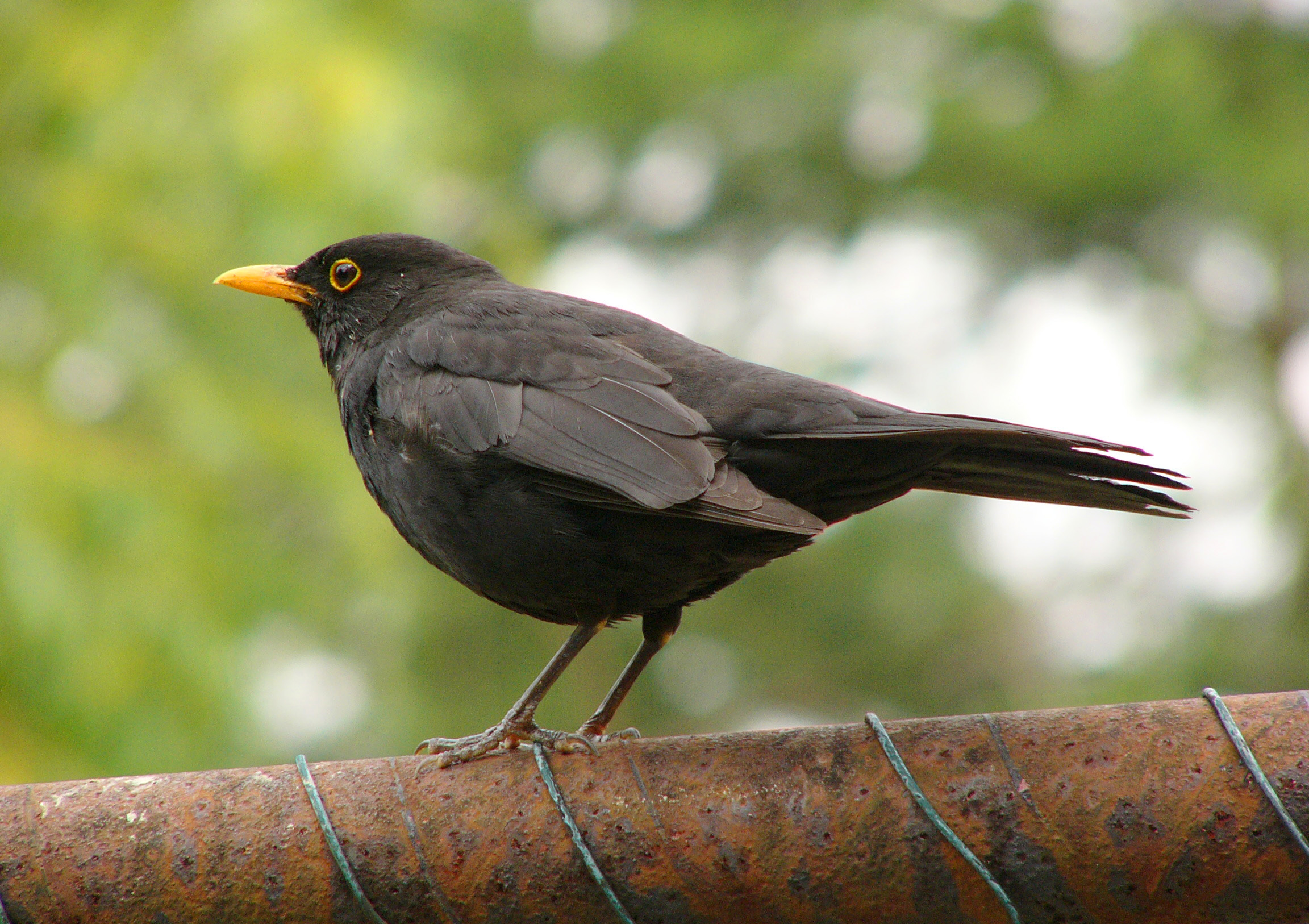
Blackbird (male)

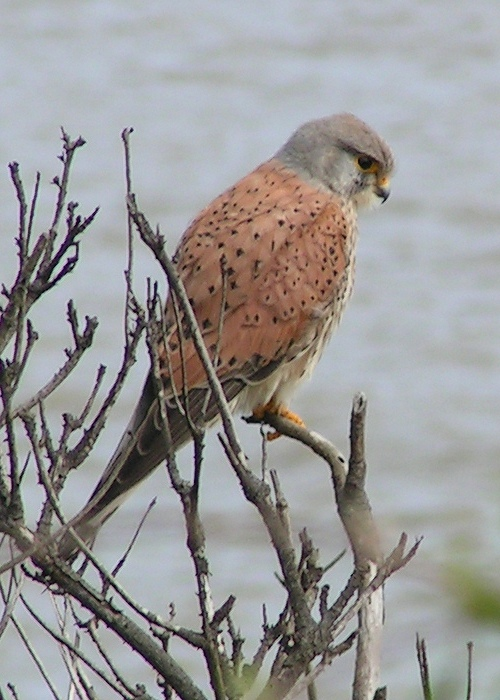
Common kestrel (male)

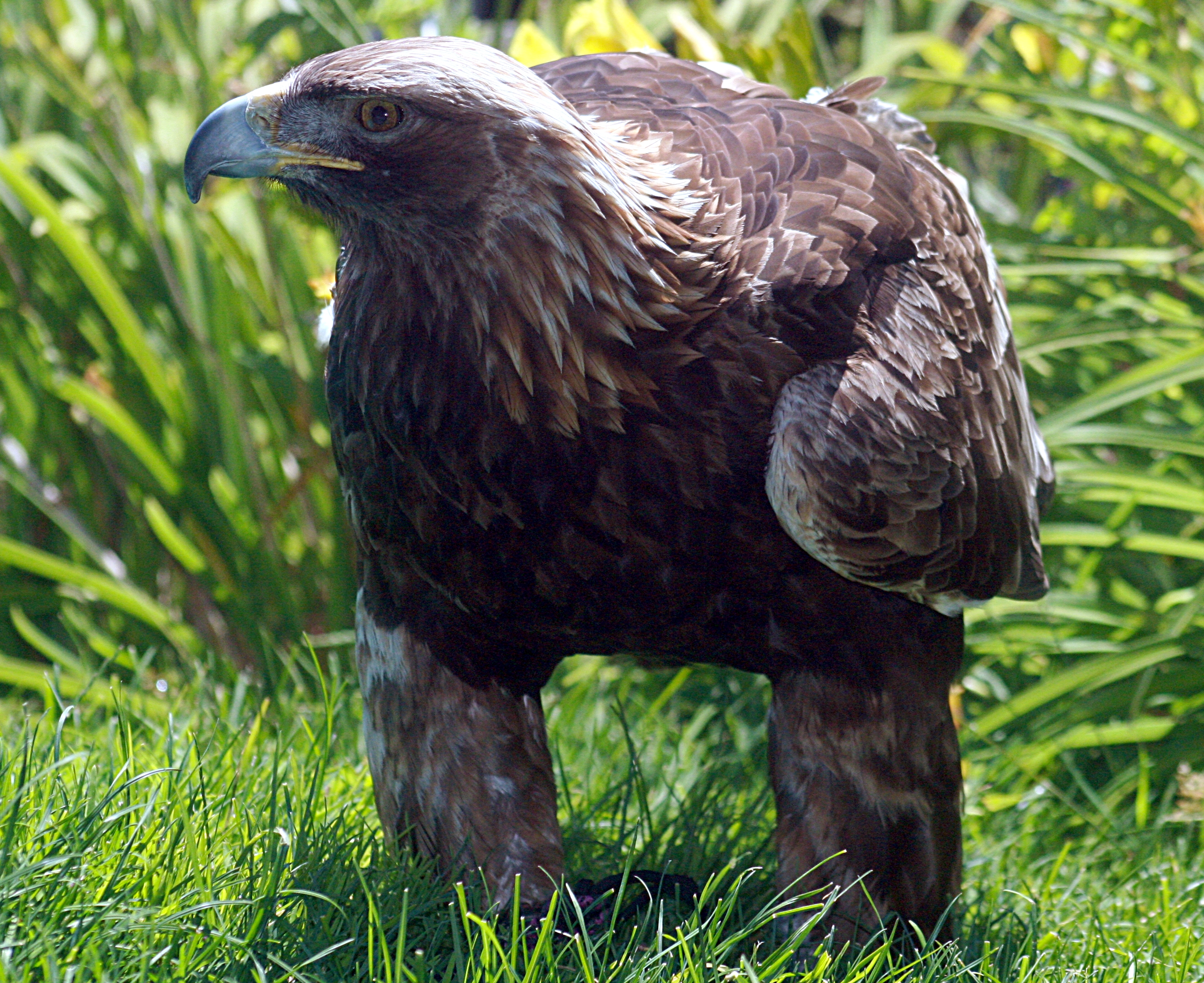
Golden eagle

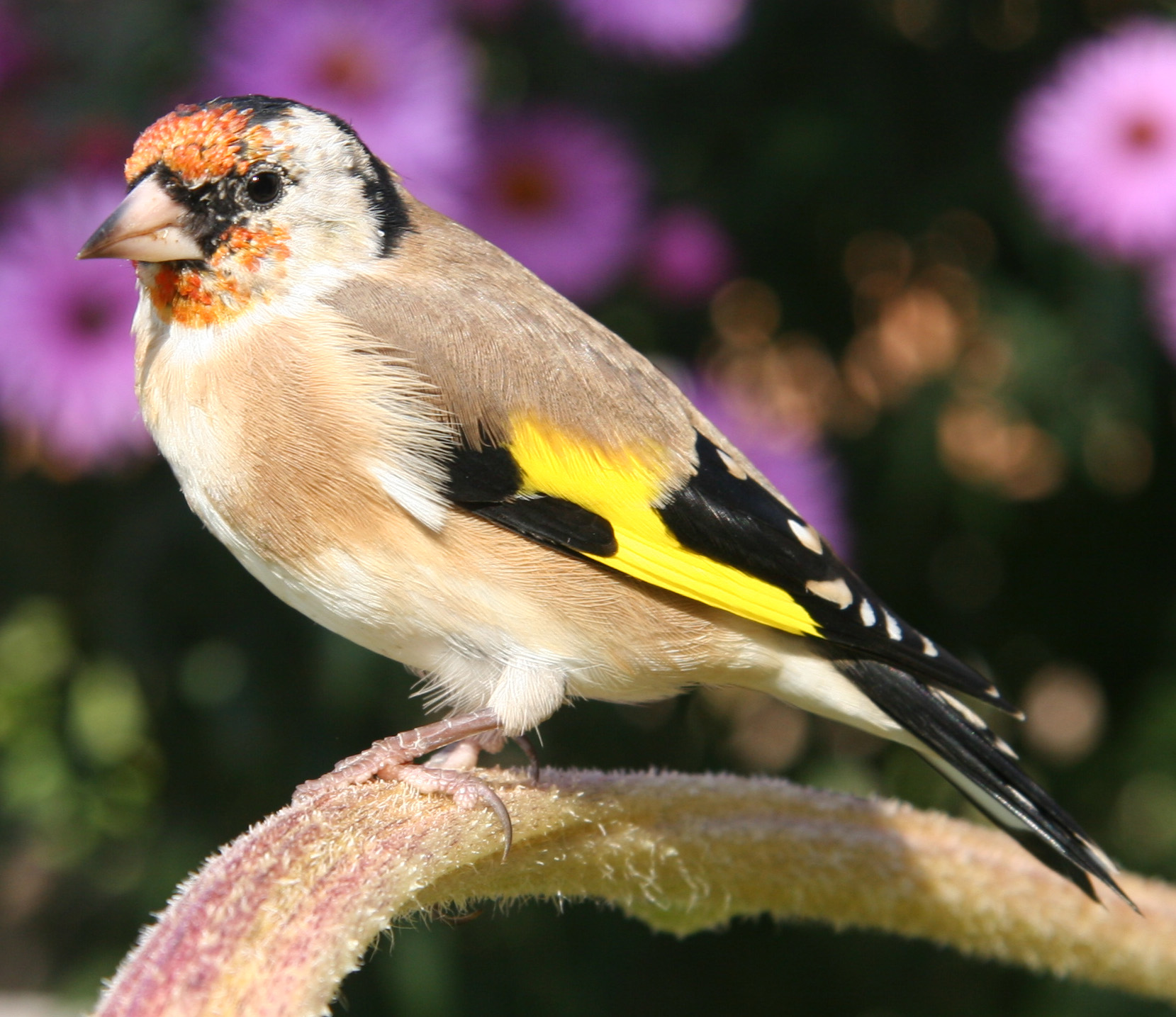
European goldfinch

==== Reptiles and amphibians ====
Al-shouf cedar reserve is home to a rich variety of reptiles, 26 species were documented with two species endemic to Lebanon and the chouf area in particular. The reserve is also home to four species of amphibians, almost the same number of species found in the whole of Lebanon. The species include: Palestinian viper (Vipera palaestinae), Greek tortoise (Testudo graeca), Mediterranean chameleon (Chamaeleon chamaeleon), European copper skink (Ablepharus kitaibelii), common toad (Bufo bufo), European green toad (Bufo viridis), Near Eastern fire salamander (Salamandra infraimmaculata), Hyla savignyi.

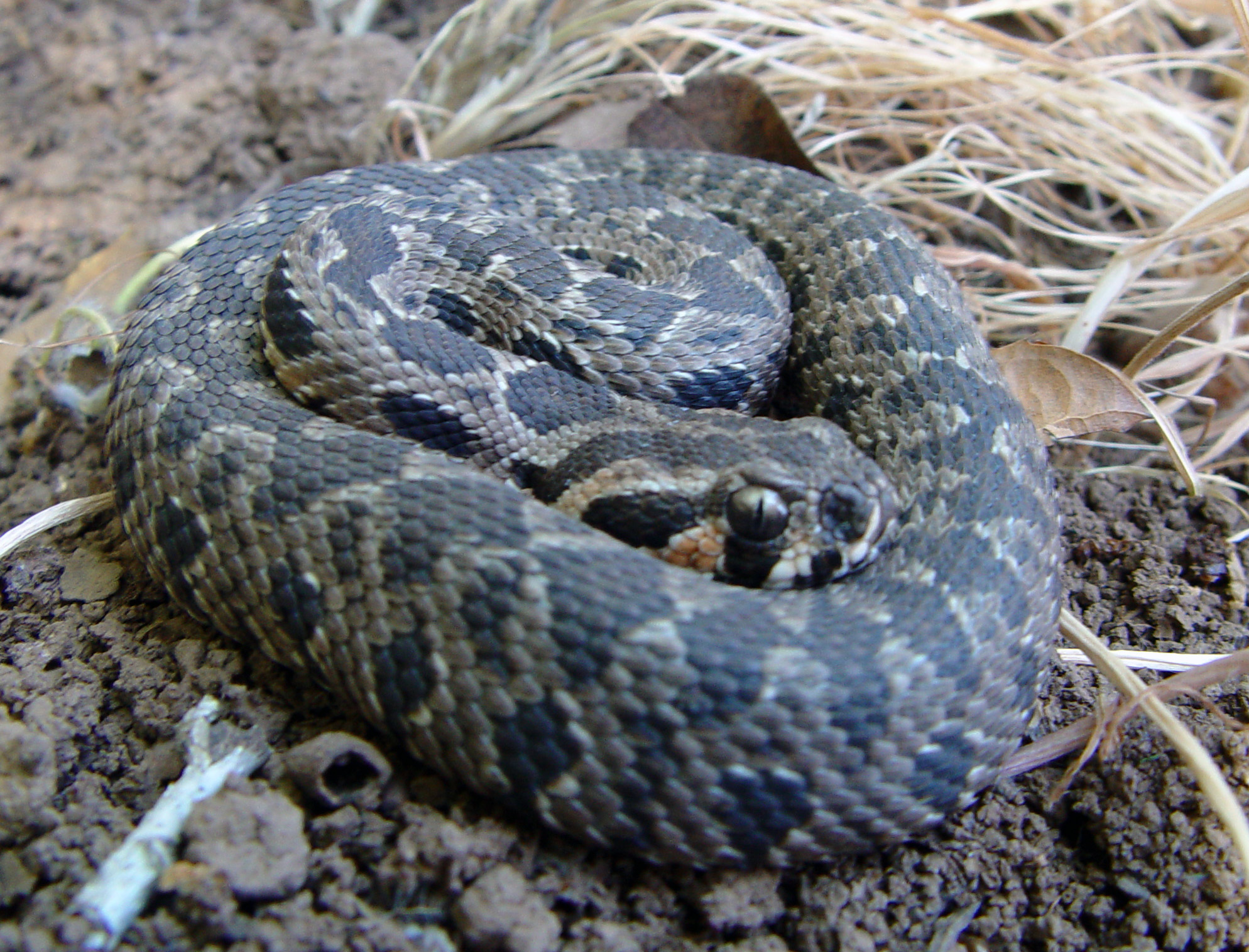
Palestinian viper

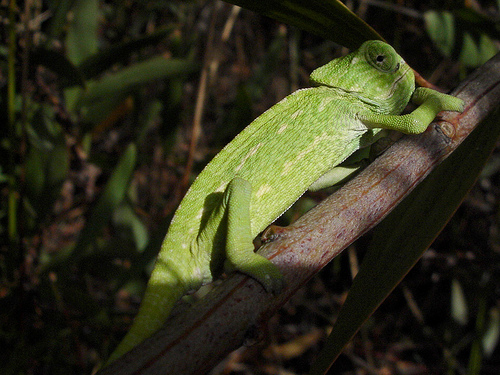
Mediterranean chameleon

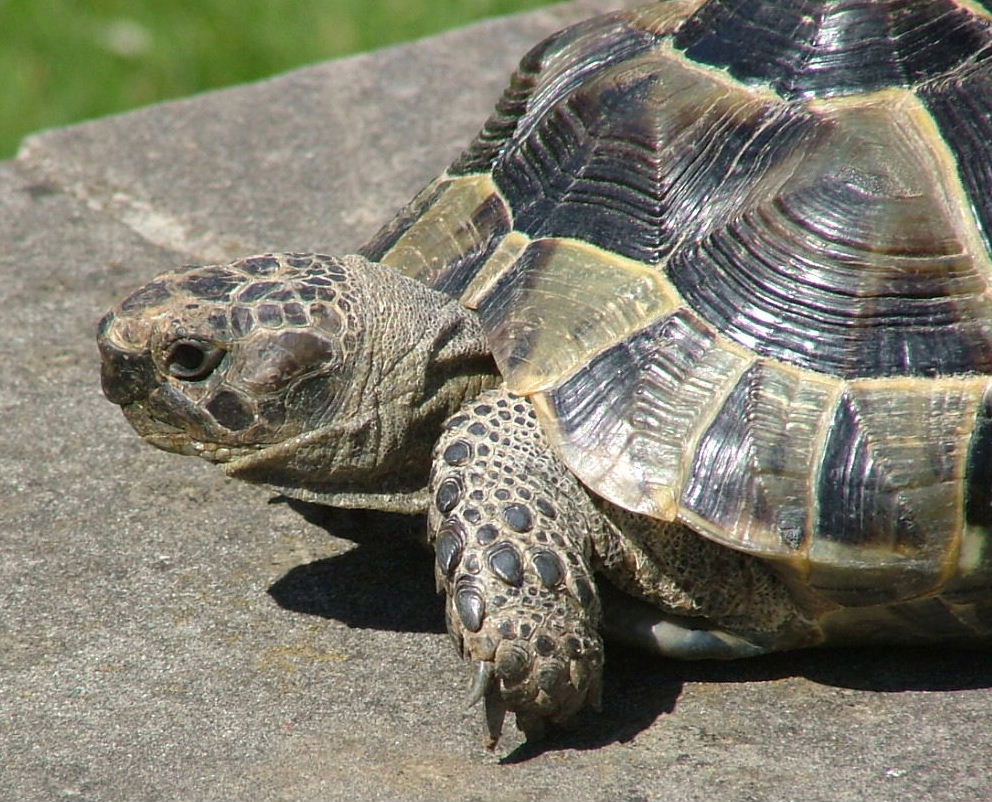
Greek tortoise

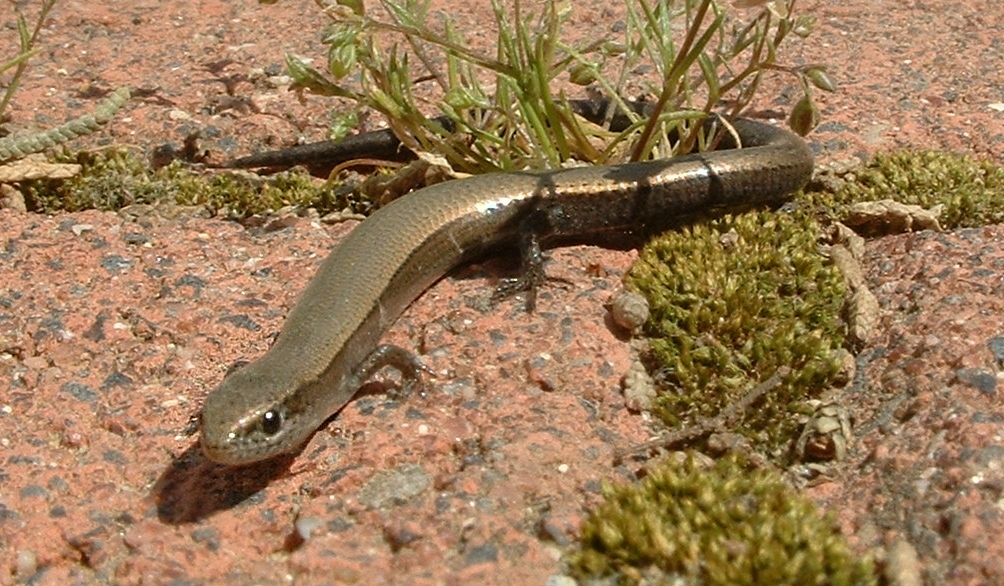
European copper skink

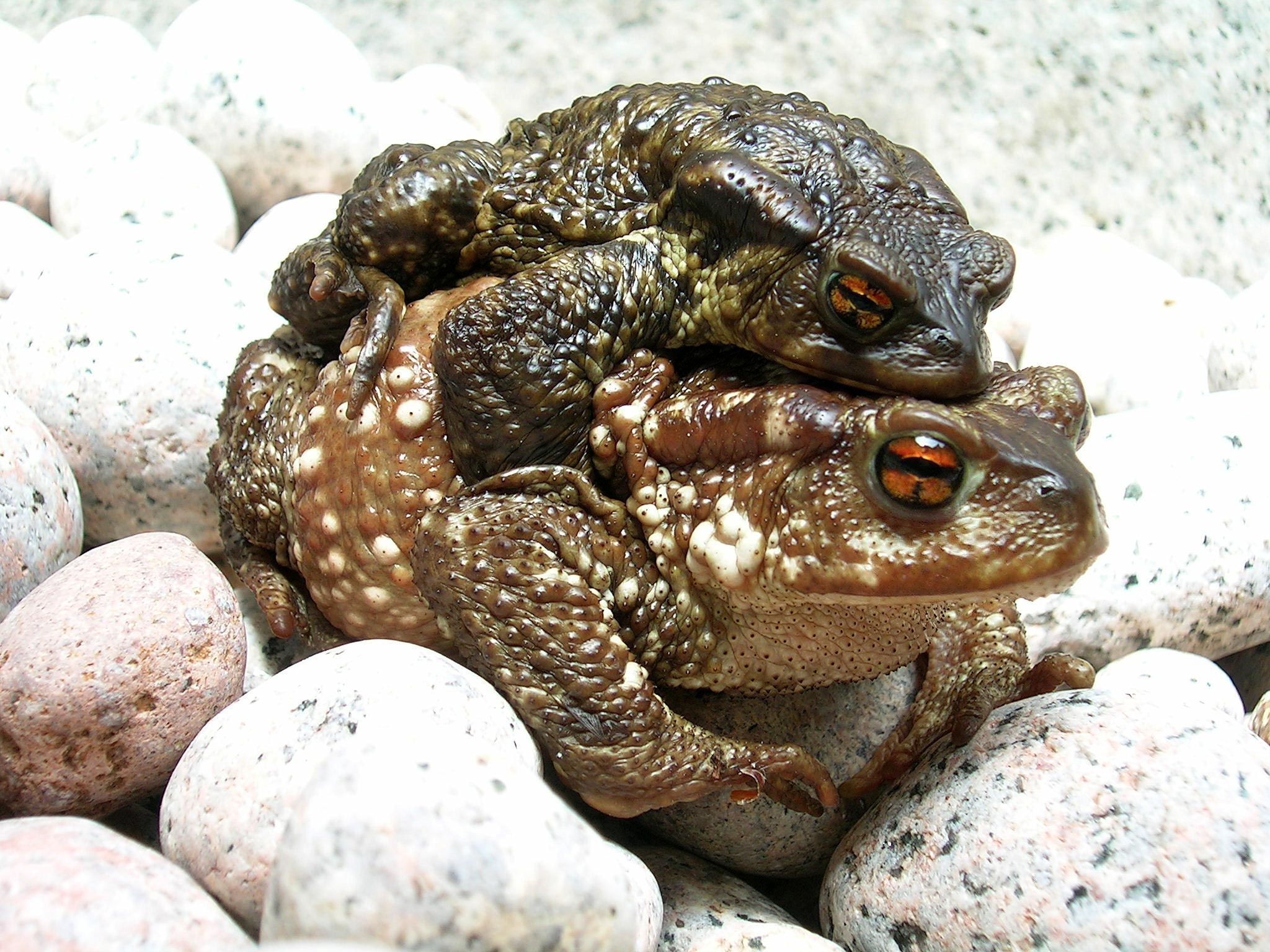
Common toad

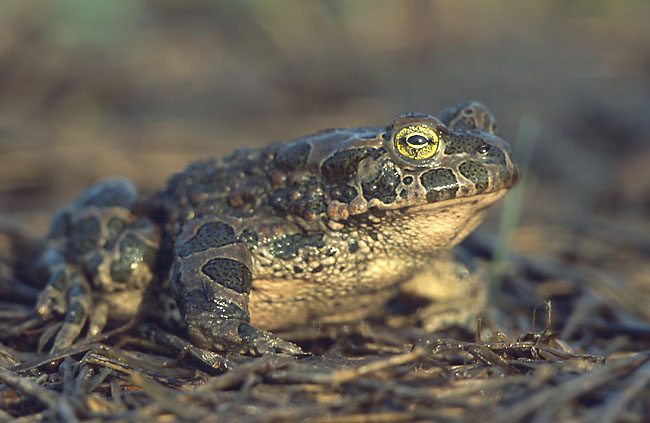
Green toad

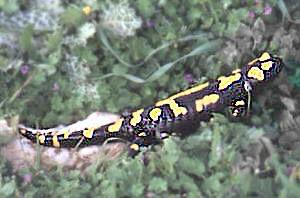
Near Eastern fire salamander

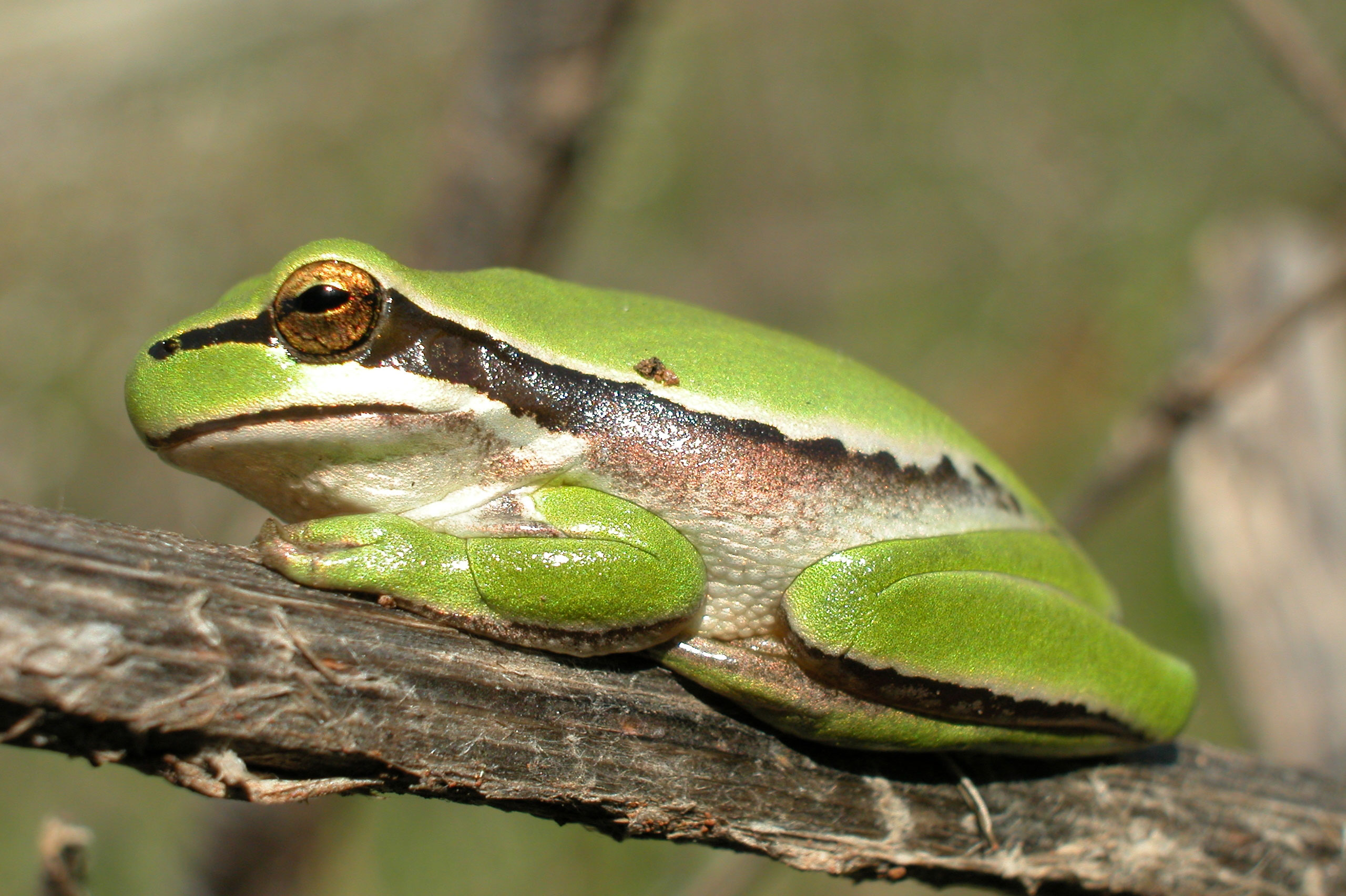
Hyla savignyi tree frog

== Cultural heritage ==
The cedar forests of Lebanon are said to be the oldest documented forests in history. They are traceable to the earliest written records, that of the Sumerians in the third millennium BC. In the ancient Sumerian story, The Epic of Gilgamesh, o cedars feature prominently.

== Landmarks ==
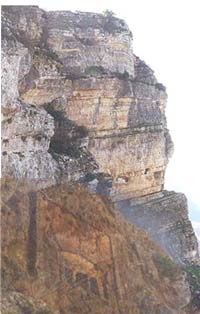
Niha cave castle

=== Qalaat Niha ===
The cave castle of Tyron Niha relates to one of the closing episodes of Prince Fakhreddin II's epic history and are the only remaining vestiges of a once powerful fortress which was successively used by the Arabs, Crusaders, and a number of princes of Mount Lebanon.

=== El Nabi Ayoub ===
A feretory was built on the hill above the village of Niha to honor Job's memory and hold his relics. Ayoub is the Arabic name of the prophet Job.

=== Qab Elias Castle ===
A lso known as the Fakhreddine Fortress was built around 1625 by Emir Fakhreddine II Maan. This once powerful Druze fortress served as a guardian outpost controlling the road that linked Beirut to Damascus, and a marching post for the Druze and Chehab rulers of the South Bekaa or Wadi al-Taym.

=== Mazar El Sit Cha'wane ===
El Sit Cha'wane is a famous figure in the Druze religion. Like Job in the Old Testament, she was held up as a model of virtue and devotion. A feretory was erected in her name.

== See also ==
- Horsh Ehden
- Aammiq Wetland
- Jabal Al Rihane Biosphere Reserve
