= Barouk =

Barouk فريديس الشوف-باروك
- Municipality
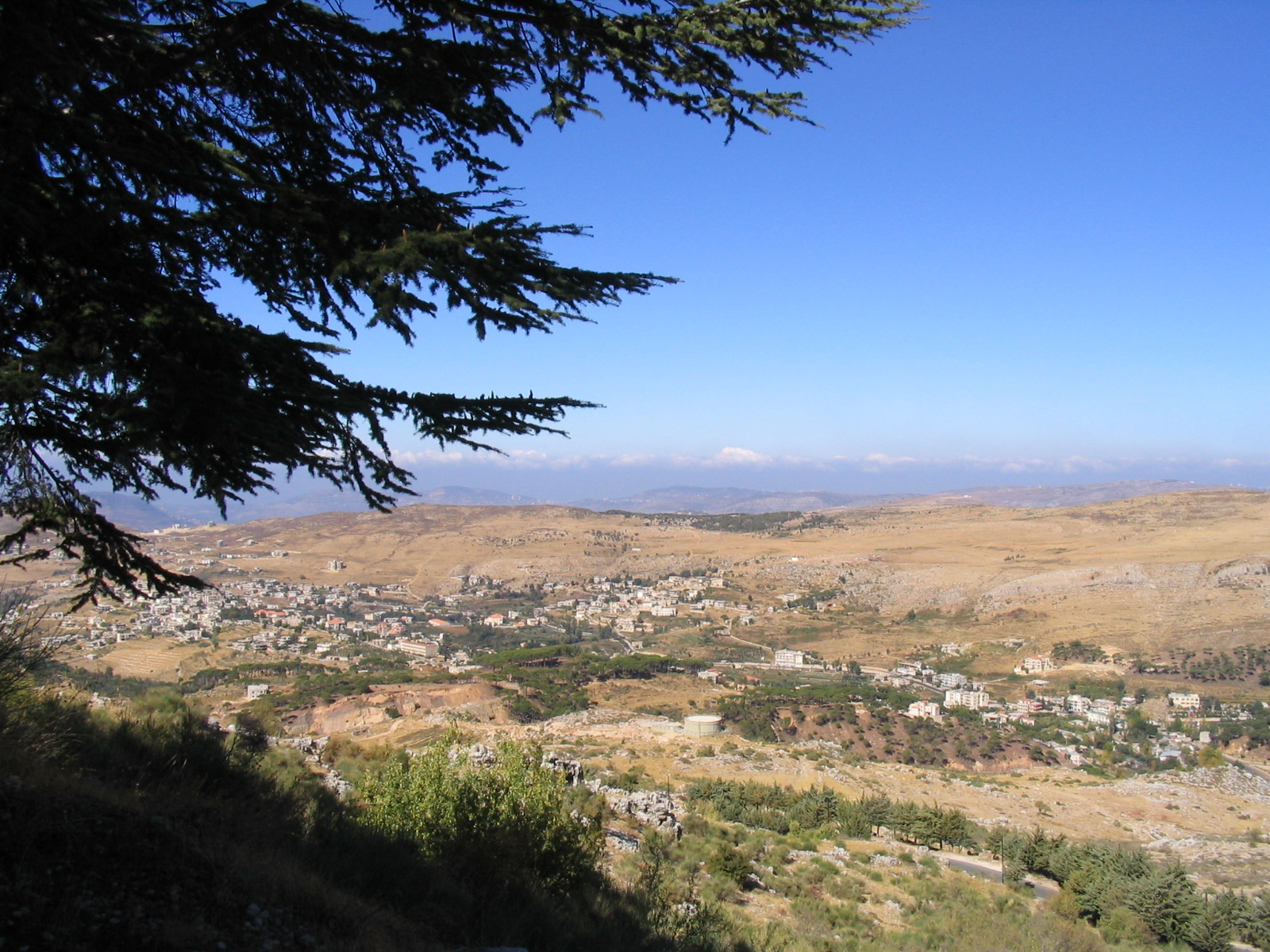
- Skyline of Barouk

- Location within Lebanon
- Coordinates: 33°42′30″N 35°40′39″E
- Country: Lebanon
- Governorate: Mount Lebanon
- District: Chouf

Area
  - Total: 27.62 km^{2} (10.66 sq mi)
- Elevation: 1,000 m (3,300 ft)

Population (2010)
  - Total: 5,197
- (Registered voters)
- Time zone: UTC+2 (EET)
  - Summer (DST): UTC+3 (EEST)
- Dialing code: +961

Barouk (Arabic: باروك, romanized: Bārūk) is a village in the Chouf District of Mount Lebanon Governorate in Lebanon. Barouk is located 52 kilometers southeast of Beirut. Its average elevation is 1000 to 1200 meters above sea level and its total land area consists of 2,762 hectares. The village had 5,197 registered voters in 2010. Its inhabitants are predominantly Druze and Maronite and Melkite Christians.

Historically, Barouk is known for being the "land of good", because of its fountain, Nabeh-el-Barouk. The poet Rachid Nakhle, the writer of the national anthem, "Kulluna lel watan", was born in Barouk. The village is also well known for its apples and other fruits, and for its many pine and oak forests. Barouk is named after the adjacent mountain of Jabal el-Barouk ('Mount Barouk'), which stands 1,943 meters above sea level. The mountain also has the largest nature reserve in Lebanon, the Al Shouf Cedar Nature Reserve.

== Economy ==
=== Agriculture ===
The town of Barouk is mostly reputed for their Apple orchards, which constitutes most of their agricultural output. The village also possesses several industrial-scale refrigerators meant to keep the apples fresh throughout the year.

=== Industry ===
Aside from many local workshops and factories, the town is home to an Aquafina water bottling plant, whose output can be found in most Lebanese retailers.

=== Hospitality and Tourism ===
The town hosts Birak Park, an amusement park and karting circuit. The town is also home to a multitude of hotels, such as the Cedar palace. The Al Shouf Cedar Nature Reserve has several trails starting and ending in the village.

It is also home to a multitude of restaurants, many of which closed during the COVID pandemic and then re-opened a few years later when things stabilized.

== Education ==
There is only one public school in the village, the Barouk Public School. The village has no private schools nor any university campuses.

The Barouk Public School has seen extensive renovations between 2018 and 2019, reconfiguring the building's layout to promote generational inter-dialogue between students and allow a dynamic exchange of ideas and experiences.

== Notable people ==
- Rachid Nakhle, author of the Lebanese national anthem.
- Amine Nakhle, writer and ex-member of the Lebanese parliament.
- Sheikh Abu Hasan Aref Halawi, important religious figure of the Druze faith.
- Nouhad Mahmoud, Lebanese diplomat to Mexico and special envoy to the UN.
