= National Anthem of Lebanon =

an-Našīd al-Waṭanī al-Lubnānī
- النشيد الوطني اللبناني
- Flag of Lebanon
- National anthem of Lebanon
- Lyrics: Rashid Nakhle
- Music: Wadih Sabra, 1925
- Adopted: 12 July 1927

Audio sample
- U.S. Navy Band instrumental version in B-flat major: file; help

The Lebanese National Anthem (Arabic: النشيد الوطني اللبناني, an-Našīd al-Waṭanī al-Lubnānī), officially known by its opening words "Koullouna lilouaṭaan lil oula lil alam" (English: All for the country, for glory, and the flag), was written by Rashid Nakhle and composed by Wadih Sabra. It was adopted on 12 July 1927, seven years after the proclamation of the state of Greater Lebanon during the French mandate.

== History ==
=== Origins ===
At the beginning of the 20th century, some poets composed hymns that praised the glories of Lebanon, its nature, and its cedars. These hymns were performed by the band of the Mount Lebanon Mutasarrifate in locations such as the square of the Serail of Baabda, the Manshieh building, Deir al-Qamar, and the garden of Rüstem Pasha in Beirut. Their purpose was to revive national sentiment in a country stifled by 400 years of occupation. These hymns were mainly intended to inspire troops, schoolchildren, policemen, and scouts, with themes centered on the Cedar of Lebanon, the homeland, and Phoenicia.

Historian Joseph Nehme mentions in the third volume of his book titled Pages du Liban that he heard Lebanese and Syrian volunteers in the Allied armies, who had entered Mount Lebanon, chanting a rallying hymn.

==== The First National Anthem ====
On the day of the proclamation of the State of Greater Lebanon by Henri Gouraud in September 1920, Father Maroun Ghosn composed a hymn that was performed at the beginning and end of the celebration. The music was initially composed by Bechara Farzan, and subsequently Paul Ashqar gave it another melody.

Titled "Lebanon, Fear Not Adversity" (Arabic: لبنان لا تخشَ العدا). It has since become part of the musical repertoire of the Lebanese Army under the title: "Hymn of Salutation to the Cedars".

The original anthem had three verses, the second one was later removed when adopted by the Lebanese Armed Forces, as it contained a phrase honoring France.

First Verse
لُبْنَانُ لَا تَخْشَ الْعِدَا كُلُّنَا تَقَلَّدَا لِيَوْمِ الْوَغَى الْمُهَنَّدَا إِخْوَانُنَا مَاتُواْ فِدَا كَيْ تَنَالَ السُّؤْدُدَا فَعِشْ لِلْمَدَىٰ مُؤَيَّدَا يَا أَرْزَةً عَلَى الْبُنُودِ أَشْرَقَتْ فَحَقَّقَتْ مُنَى الْجُدُودْ ،أَبْطَالُنَا بِحَسْرَةٍ قَدْ قَضَوْا وَهُمْ عَلَىٰ رَجَا الْوُعُودْ	Lebanon, fear not adversity, For we are all armed for the day of battle. Our brothers have fallen faithfully, so that you may attain glory, So live forever glorified. O Cedar on the banners, Shining and fulfilling our ancestors dream, Our heroes, full of sorrow, Have departed, carrying hope in the promises.
Chorus:
أَلَا فَارْفَعُواْ لِلْعُلَىٰ ،رَايَةً لَاحَ فِيهَا أَرْزُنَا فَيَا مَا حَلَا، مَا حَلَا أَرْزُنَا رَمْزُنَا وَعِزُّنَا	Come, raise high, to glory, The banner where our Cedar waves. Ah, how beautiful, how beautiful, Our Cedar, our symbol, and our honor.
Second Verse
بُشْرَاكَ يَا لُبْنَانَنَا فُزْتَ فُزْتَ بِالْمُنَى فَلِلَّهِ نَرْفَعُ الثَّنَى فرَنْسَا لَا نُنْسَى لَهَا نُبْلَهَا وَفَضْلَهَا أَجَلْ حُبُّهَا بِقَلْبِنَا يَا لِلدِّمَا وَقَدْ جَرَى سَبْلُهَا مُدَفَّقًا عَلَى الثَّرَى لُبْنَانُنَا جِبَالُهُ تَفَطَّرَتْ تَصَدَّعَتْ تَحَسُّرًا	Good news oh our Lebanon! You got your desire, we thank God for that France, we will not forget her nobility and virtue Yes, we love her in our hearts Oh, the blood that has flowed out onto the soil Our Lebanon, its mountains, broke down and cracked in regret
Chorus
Third Verse
لُبْنَانُ إِنَّا فِي السَّلَامْ نُكْرِمُ الضَّيْفَ الْهُمَامْ، وَنَرْعَىٰ حُقُوقَ الْأَنَامْ وَإِنْ دَجَا لَيْلُ الْخِصَامْ نُورِدُ الْخَصْمَ الْحِمَامْ، بِمَاضِي غِرَازِ الْحُسَامْ ،قَلْبُنَا قُـدَّ مِنْ صُخُورْ، بَطْشُنا يُرْعِبُ اللَّيْثَ الْهَصُورْ إِنْ طَغَى الضِّدُّ أَوْ بَغَىٰ صَارَ مَطْعَمَ الْوُحُوشِ وَالنُّسُورْ	Lebanon, in peace, We honor the noble guest and uphold human rights. But if the night of conflict falls, We repel our enemies with the sharpness of our blades. Our hearts are forged from stone, Our might terrifies even the fiercest lion. If the adversary oppresses or attacks, He shall become the prey of beasts and vultures.
Chorus

Among the anthems of this period, there was also one composed by the "poet of the cedars", Chibli Mallat, or Youssef al-Sawda. In this atmosphere, the deputy Sheikh Ibrahim al-Moundhir urged the Parliament to draft an official national anthem, following the example of independent nations.

"The influence of national songs on the soul is undeniable. There is no advanced nation in the world, nor any nation aspiring to be one, that does not have a national anthem—one that its children, young and old, know by heart and sing during national events and in every literary gathering."

=== The Modern National Anthem ===
A first attempt was made in 1925 by the French governor of Greater Lebanon at the time, Léon Cayla, to launch a competition under the supervision of a jury that included, among others, Georges Corm, Henri Pharaon, Wadih Sabra, and Ahmad Fleifel. However, inspiration did not strike the poets, or at least no melody or lyrics managed to convince the jury.

The following year, in May 1926, the Lebanese Republic was proclaimed, and Charles Debbas was elected president. The first government under the new president sought to create a Lebanese national anthem and formed a committee to arbitrate between competing poets in Lebanon and the Lebanese diaspora to select the anthem.

On July 19, 1926, a decree titled "Competition for the Selection of the Lebanese National Anthem" was published in the official gazette. Article 1 of this decree stated that the competition was divided into two sections: "A competition to choose an Arabic poem whose lyrics are suitable for the Lebanese anthem" and another competition among composers to select the melody for the chosen poem. Article 2 stipulated that the arbitration committee, chaired by the eminent linguist Sheikh Abdallah Boustany and the Minister of Public Education and Fine Arts, Najib Amouni, along with members including Ibrahim el Mounzer, Jamil Bey al-Azm, Abdel-Rahim Kleilat, Wadih Akl, Ibrahim al-Moundhir, Chibli Bey Malat, Andel Basset Fathallah, and Élias Fayad, was given the significant task of selecting a national anthem for the newly proclaimed Republic.

By the end of October 1926, the competition results were announced, and the winning anthem was the one composed by poet Rachid Nakhle. Driven by a deep desire to best serve his country and to silence those who believed that uniting all Lebanese factions under one refrain was impossible, he wrote a poem in one sitting in his hometown of Barouk. However, to avoid leveraging his fame, he signed the text with a pseudonym, Maabad.

It is said that Béchara el-Khoury, then Minister of the Interior, asked him to remove a stanza referencing the unity of the cross and the crescent, and that the 1,000 livres he won were donated to charity. After the lyrics of the national anthem were chosen, the final version was published in Lebanese newspapers so that composers could compete to set it to music.

On July 12, 1927, Decree 1855 was issued, stipulating in its first article that "the melody composed by Professor Wadih Sabra, director of the Lebanese National Higher Conservatory of Music, is considered the official melody of the Lebanese national anthem." The anthem was officially adopted by decree on July 12, 1927. The anthem was retained upon independence in 1943.

Among the texts not selected by the jury was one by Abdel-Halim Hajjar, which was noted by the jury but later withdrawn by the author, and another by Chebli Mallat. The latter had a feminist touch, as it began with the lines: "Daughters of the Cedars / Sing for us / The symbols of our proud cedars..." This line was recently reintroduced in Carole Sakr's rendition: "Lebanon, land of women and men."

The anthem was first performed on May 30, 1927, at the club of the Maronite Sagesse School during a play, in the presence of the president of the Republic, several deputies, ministers, and notable figures.

In 2018, on the occasion of the 91st anniversary of the Lebanese anthem, a proposal was made to designate a national holiday in its honor.

=== Controversy Over the Rif Anthem ===
Rasha Al Karam of Al Jadeed TV released a controversial mini-documentary in 2011 about the Lebanese national anthem, claiming that the tune and lyrics were actually plagiarized from the "Anthem of the Rif", a song written for Abdelkrim el-Khattabi and composed by Lebanese composer Mohammed Fleifel in 1924. This anthem was allegedly adopted as an official hymn one year before the Lebanese national anthem appeared.

Despite the efforts of artist Ghassan Rahbani, who claimed to have discovered the plagiarism to highlight the seriousness of the matter and called for changing the anthem, the attempt to turn the anthem scandal into a public issue ultimately failed.

According to Al Jadeed, in the winter of 1924, while Arab newspapers were in a frenzy over the Berber victories against the Spanish and French armies, Ibrahim Touqan, Abdelrahim Qleilat, and Mohammed Fleifel gathered at Café du Carillon (now Café du Théâtre Farouk), where Touqan came up with the idea of composing an anthem for the revolt and the liberation of Arab peoples. The song was composed by Fleifel. However, Fleifel never acknowledged any collaboration with Touqan before 1936.

According to Lebanese historian Charles Hayek, the Republic of the Rif never had an official anthem. He argues that the confusion stems from a Moroccan documentary published in 1959, which used the melody of the Lebanese anthem.

The only evidence of plagiarism is a segment from a documentary about Moroccan politician Mahdi Ben Barka, in which the melody of the Lebanese national anthem is played over footage of King Mohammed V, but with different lyrics. Additionally, the book Deux poètes contemporains by Omar Farroukh concludes that Mohammed Fleifel sold the melody of the "Anthem of the Hero of the Rif" to Wadia Sabra. However, while the "Anthem of the Rif" was indeed composed by the Fleifel brothers, its melody differed from that of the national anthem composed by Sabra.

According to Professor Joumana Mrad, the "Anthem of the Rif" was highly popular at the time, making it difficult to steal or plagiarize for resale. This suggests that the claim that the Rif melody was sold is a false accusation.

In an interview with Kadimokom, music arranger Nemer Habib revealed that, based on his research, when the Lebanese government decided to organize a competition for the national anthem, the jury committee asked the Fleifel brothers to select the appropriate poetic meter. They chose the meter of "The Hero of the Rif" so that poets could compose the Lebanese national anthem using its structure and poetic form.

=== Composition ===
The music of the national anthem was influenced by Beirut's exposure to Western culture at the end of the 19th century. It was composed in 1925 by Wadia Sabra, an artist trained in France.

== Lyrics ==
MSA original

١
كُلُّنَـا لِلْوَطَـنْ لِلْعُـلَا لِلْعَـلَمْ
مِلْءُ عَيْنِ الزَّمَنْ سَـيْفُنَا وَالْقَـلَمْ
سَهْلُنَا وَالْجَبَـلْ مَنْبِتٌ لِلرِّجَـالْ
قَوْلُنَا وَالْعَمَـلْ فِي سَبِيلِ الْكَمَالْ

كورال:
كُلُّنَا لِلْوَطَنْ لِلْعُلَا لِلْعَلَمْ
كُلُّنَا لِلْوَطَنْ

٢

شَيْخُنَـا وَالْفَتَـى عِنْـدَ صَـوْتِ الْوَطَنْ
أُسْـدُ غَـابٍ مَتَى سَـاوَرَتْنَا الْفِــتَنْ
شَــرْقُنَـا قَلْبُـهُ أَبَــدًا لُبْـنَانْ
صَانَهُ رَبُّهُ لِمَدَى الْأَزْمَانْ

كورال

٣
بَحْـرُهُ بَــرُّهُ دُرَّةُ الشَّرْقَيْن
رِفْـدُهُ بِــرُّهُ مَالِئُ الْقُطْبَيْن
إِسْمُـهُ عِـزُّهُ مُنْذُ كَانَ الْجُدُودْ
مَجْــدُهُ أَرْزُهُ رَمْزُهُ لِلْخُلُودْ

كورال

Romanization (EALL)

I
Kullunā li-l-waṭan, li-l-ʿulā li-l-ʿalam
Milʾu ʿayn iz-zaman, sayfunā wa-l-qalam
Sahlunā wa-l-jabal, manbitun li-r-rijāl
Qawlunā wa-l-ʿamal fī sabīli l-kamāl

Kūrāl:
Kullunā li-l-waṭan, li-l-ʿulā li-l-ʿalam
Kullunā li-l-waṭan

II
Šayxunā wa-l-fatā, ʿinda ṣawti l-waṭan
ʾUsdu ġābin matā, sāwaratnā l-fitan
Šarqunā qalbuhu, ʾabadan Lubnān
Ṣānahu rabbuhu, li-madā l-ʾazmān

Kūrāl

III
Baḥruhu barruhu, durratu š-šarqayn
Rifduhu birruhu, māliʾu l-quṭbayn
ʾIsmuhu ʿizzuhu, munḏu kāna l-judūd
Majduhu ʾarzuhu, ramzuhu li-l-xulūd

Kūrāl

IPA transcription (Note: See Help:IPA/Arabic) (Note: The anthem is usually sung using the MSA pronunciation instead of Lebanese Arabic.)

1
[kʊl.lʊ.næː lɪ‿l.wɑ.tˤɑn | lɪ‿l.ʕʊ.læː lɪ‿l.ʕɑ.læm]
[mɪl.ʔu ʕɑjn ɪz.zæ.mæn | sæj.fu.næː wæ‿l.qɑ.læm]
[sæh.lʊ.næː wæ‿l.ʒæ.bæl | mæn.bi.tʊn lɪ‿r.ri.ʒæːl]
[qɑw.lʊ.næː wæ‿l.ʕɑ.mæl fiː sæ.biː.lɪl kæ.mæːl]

[kuː.rɑːl]
[kʊl.lʊ.næː lɪ‿l.wɑ.tˤɑn | lɪ‿l.ʕʊ.læː lɪ‿l.ʕɑ.læm]
[kʊl.lʊ.næː lɪ‿l.wɑ.tˤɑn]

2
[ʃæj.xu.næː wæ‿l.fæ.tæː | ʕɪn.dæ sˤɑw.tɪ‿l.wɑ.tˤɑn]
[ʔʊs.dʊ ɣæː.bɪn mæ.tæː | sæː.wɑ.ræt.næː‿l.fi.tæn]
[ʃɑr.qʊ.næː qɑl.bʊ.hu | ʔæ.bæ.dæn lʊb.næːn]
[sˤɑː.næ.hu rɑb.bʊ.hu | li mæ.dæː‿l.ʔæz.mæːn]

[kuː.rɑːl]

3
[bɑħ.rʊ.hu bɑr.rʊ.hu | dʊr.rɑ.tʊ‿ʃ.ʃɑr.qɑjn]
[rɪf.dʊ.hu bɪr.rʊ.hu | mæː.li.ʔʊ‿l.qʊtˤ.bɑjn]
[ʔɪs.mʊ.hu ʕɪz.zʊ.hu | mun.zu kæː.næ‿l.ʒʊ.duːd]
[mæʒ.dʊ.hu ʔær.zʊ.hu | ræm.zʊ.hu lɪ‿l.xʊ.luːd]

[kuː.rɑːl]

French translation

I
Tous pour la patrie, pour la gloire et le drapeau.
Par l'épée et la plume nous marquons les temps.
Notre plaine et nos montagnes font des hommes vigoureux.
À la perfection nous consacrons notre parole et notre travail.

Refrain:
Tous pour la patrie, pour la gloire et le drapeau.
Tous pour la patrie.

II
Nos vieux et nos jeunes attendent l'appel de la patrie.
Le jour de la crise, ils sont comme les lions de la jungle.
Le cœur de notre Orient demeure à jamais le Liban.
Que Dieu le préserve jusqu'à la fin des temps.

Refrain

III
Sa terre et sa mer sont les joyaux des deux orients.
Ses bonnes actions envahissent les pôles.
Son nom est sa gloire depuis le début des temps.
Son cèdre est sa fierté, son symbole éternel.

Refrain

English translation

I
All of us! For our Country, for our Glory and Flag!
Our valor and our writings are the envy of the ages.
Our mountain and our valley, they bring forth stalwart men.
And to Perfection we devote our words and labor.

Chorus:
All of us! For our Country, for our Glory and Flag!
All of us! For our Country!

II
Our Elders and our children, they await our Country's call,
And on the Day of Crisis they are as Lions of the Jungle.
The heart of our East is ever Lebanon,
God has preserved him until the end of time.

Chorus

III
The Gems of the East are his land and sea.
Throughout the world his good deeds flow from pole to pole.
And his name is his glory since time began.
The cedars are his pride, his immortality's symbol.

Chorus
