= Rachid Nakhle =

Lebanese poet, writer and journalist

- رشيد نخلة
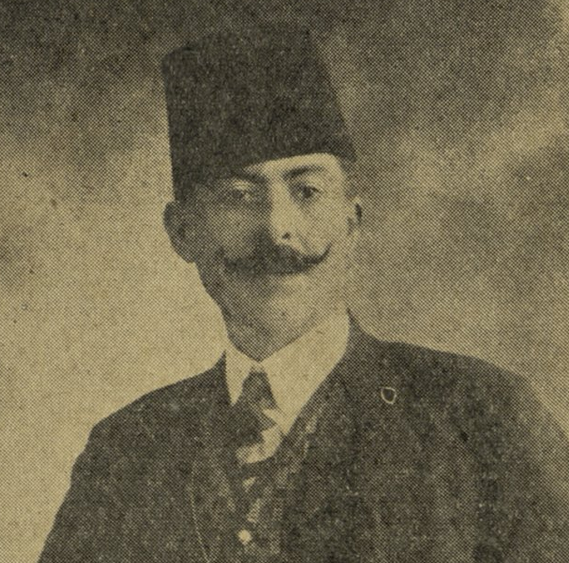
- Born: 6 February 1873; Barouk, Mount Lebanon
- Died: 1939 (aged 65–66); Barouk
- Resting place: Rashid Nakhle Cultural Center
- Education: American school of Souk El Gharb
- Occupations: Poet, writer and journalist
- Notable work: The National Anthem of Lebanon
- Children: Amine Nakhle (son); Marcel Nakhle (daughter)

Rachid Nakhle (Arabic: رشيد نخلة ;February 1873-1939) was a Lebanese poet, writer and journalist born in the village of Barouk in the district of Mount Lebanon. He studied in the school of Ain Zhalta, and later, at the American school of Souk El Gharb. He is notably remembered for authoring the lyrics of the Lebanese national anthem.

== Early life and career ==
Nakhle was born in Barouk on 6 February 1873, he was first schooled at the school of Ain Zhalta and he completed his studies in the American school of Souk El Gharb. He was appointed as the kaymakam of Jezzine in 1911 succeeding his father and then the directorate of Deir el Qamar in 1914, in 1915 he got exiled to Jerusalem by Djemal Pasha, after the end of the ottoman rule in 1918 he was appointed head of the Arab pen and Lebanon's knowledge director, and in 1920, as inspector of public security. In 1925 he became the governor of the city of Sidon until his resignation in 1930.

== Involvement with journalism ==
Nakhle began his journalistic career by founding the newspaper Al-Sha'ab in Ain Zhalta on September 28, 1912, while residing in Nabaa al-Safa. The newspaper was distributed for free, driven by a commitment to freedom and literature. Amin Nakhle recalls: "In the early days, Al-Sha'ab was printed at the 'Deir El-Qamar Press' in Deir El-Qamar, and its header stated: 'A newspaper created to serve the people, distributed for free.' On November 8, 1922, I started publishing it in Beirut. At that time, Al-Sha'ab was a weekly, but the government banned it three times. It then became a daily, but was banned four times. Afterward, it went back to being a weekly, and was banned twice more. When it resumed as a daily, it was banned several times again. I can’t remember the exact number of times. Since then, its publication ceased." In this way, the author of these lines (Amin Nakhle) "fulfilled the vow of loyalty" on more than one occasion.

== Selected works ==
Rachid Nakhle composed poetry for fifty years, in eloquent, Zajal, Ghazal, love, Rithā and social poetry.

He authored a collection of works spanning poetry, verse, memoirs, history, criticism, literature, sociology, letters, and politics. His writings include both Classical Arabic and colloquial styles, along with prose. The following is a list of his publications:

In literature and society: "The book of the past", "Memoirs of Rachid Nakhleh", "Letters of Rachid Nakhleh", “A Stranger at Home” that was printed in Baabda in 1898, "Lebanese Passions", printed in Beirut in 1910.

In poetry: "The Divan of the Heavenly Poet," which is his poetry collection. This name was chosen based on what Wali al-Din Yakan said about Rashid Nakhle in his book 'Afw al-Khater (p. 97, 1955 edition), where he referred to him as a celestial poet.

In Zajal poetry: "Muhsin al-Hazzan" (a novel), first published in Beirut in 1936, then printed in Brazil in 1940, and later in Sidon with an undated edition, and in Damascus under the name "Hind bint Jafeel." This edition is also undated. "The Meaning of Rashid Nakhle" (a collection of his Zajal poems) was published in Beirut in 1945. Other works include "Antar" (a novel), "The Continuation of the Meaning of Rashid Nakhle" (which includes Zajal poems he discovered after his Zajal collection was printed), and "The Lebanese Divan" (a compilation of his works in various Lebanese Zajal styles).
